= Timeline of architecture =

This is a timeline of architecture, indexing the individual year in architecture pages. Notable events in architecture and related disciplines including structural engineering, landscape architecture, and city planning. One significant architectural achievement is listed for each year.

**Contents**	Summary of events in architecture – by year
21st Century:	2000s – 2010s – 2020s
20th Century:	1900s – 1910s – 1920s – 1930s – 1940s – 1950s – 1960s – 1970s – 1980s – 1990s
19th Century:	1800s – 1810s – 1820s – 1830s – 1840s – 1850s – 1860s – 1870s – 1880s – 1890s
18th Century:	1700s – 1710s – 1720s – 1730s – 1740s – 1750s – 1760s – 1770s – 1780s – 1790s
Pre-18th Century:	1000s – 1100s – 1200s – 1300s – 1400s – 1500s – 1600s
	Neolithic – 3rd millennium BC – 2nd millennium BC – 1st millennium BC – 1st millennium AD

Articles for each year (in bold text, below) are summarized here with a significant event as a reference point.

== 2020s ==
- **2026** – The central tower of the Sagrada Família attains the pinnacle height of 172.5 m (566 ft) making it the tallest church in the world.
- **2025** – Universal Epic Universe opened in Orlando, Florida.
- **2024** – The Arch of Reunification in North Korea is demolished.
- **2023** – The Richard Gilder Center for Science, Education, and Innovation at the American Museum of Natural History in New York City designed by Studio Gang opened to the public.
- **2022** – 1915 Çanakkale Bridge in Turkey, the longest suspension bridge in the world, is completed.
- **2021** – Central Park Tower in New York City, the tallest residential building in the world, is completed.
- **2020** – Torres Obispado in Monterrey, Mexico is completed making it the tallest skyscraper in Latin America.

== 2010s ==
- **2019** – Notre-Dame fire
- 2018 – Landmark 81 is completed in Ho Chi Minh City making it the tallest building in Vietnam and the second tallest building in Southeast Asia.
- **2017** – Apple's new headquarters Apple Park, designed by Norman Foster opens in Cupertino, California.
- **2016** – MahaNakhon opens in Bangkok. Zaha Hadid dies.
- **2015** – Shanghai Tower, the tallest building in China and the second-tallest building in the world is completed. Charles Correa dies.
- **2014** – One World Trade Center opens in New York City.
- **2013** – Gran Torre Santiago is completed in Santiago.
- **2012** – Tokyo Skytree opens in Tokyo. Queen Elizabeth Olympic Park opens in London in conjunction with the 2012 Summer Olympics. Oscar Niemeyer dies.
- **2011** – Al Hamra Tower, the tallest skyscraper in Kuwait is completed.
- **2010** – Burj Khalifa becomes the tallest man-made structure in the world at 828 metres (2,717 ft). The Bridge of Peace is completed in Tbilisi, Georgia.

== 2000s ==
- **2009** – CityCenter opens on the Las Vegas Strip in Paradise, Nevada.
- **2008** – The "Water Cube", "Bird's Nest", South railway station, and other buildings in Beijing, are completed for the 2008 Summer Olympics.
- **2007** – Tarald Lundevall completes the Oslo Opera House in Oslo, Norway.
- **2006** – Construction begins on the first phase of the High Line elevated greenway on the west side of Manattan.
- **2005** – Casa da Música opens in Porto, Portugal, designed by the Dutch architect Rem Koolhaas with Office for Metropolitan Architecture.
- **2004** – 30 St Mary Axe, designed by Norman Foster, is completed in the City of London. Holy Trinity Cathedral of Tbilisi becomes the tallest church in Georgia.
- **2003** – Taipei 101, designed by C.Y. Lee & Partners, the world's tallest building from 2004 to 2010 is topped out.
- **2002** – Simmons Hall dormitory, designed by architect Steven Holl, completed at the Massachusetts Institute of Technology.
- **2001** – Jewish Museum Berlin designed by Daniel Libeskind opens to the public.
- **2000** – The Emirates Towers are both completed in Dubai, The London Eye is open in London.

== 1990s ==
- **1999** – The Bundestag holds its first meeting in the Reichstag building in Berlin after the completion of a major redesign by Norman Foster.
- **1998** – Petronas Twin Towers, Kuala Lumpur, Malaysia, designed by César Pelli completed (world tallest building 1998–2004). Kiasma Museum of Contemporary Art by Steven Holl opens to public.
- **1997** – Guggenheim Museum Bilbao designed by Frank Gehry. Sky Tower (Auckland) completed.
- **1996** – Oscar Niemeyer completes the Niterói Contemporary Art Museum in Brazil.
- **1995** – Steven Holl Architects begin construction of St. Ignatius Chapel at Seattle University.
- **1994** – Building of the Basel Signal Box by Herzog and de Meuron
- **1993** – The Umeda Sky Building in Osaka City, Japan is completed.
- **1992** – The Bank of America Corporate Center in Charlotte, North Carolina is completed.
- **1991** – Stansted Airport terminal building in Essex, England, designed by Norman Foster, is completed.
- **1990** – Frederick Weisman Museum of Art, University of Minnesota completed by Frank Gehry.

== 1980s ==
- **1989** – I. M. Pei's pyramid addition to the Louvre is opened.
- **1988** – MOMA Exhibition called Deconstructivist architecture opens.
- **1987** – The Riga Radio & TV Tower in Riga, Latvia is completed.
- **1986** – The Lloyd's Building in London, designed by Richard Rogers, is completed.
- **1985** – The HSBC Headquarters Building in Hong Kong, China by Norman Foster, is completed.
- **1984** – Philip Johnson's AT&T Building opens in New York City
- **1983** – Xanadu House in Kissimmee opened.
- **1982** – Design competition is held for the Parc de la Villette in Paris.
- **1981** – Richard Serra installs Tilted Arc in the Federal Plaza in New York City. The sculpture is removed in 1989.
- **1980** – Santa Monica Place constructed by Frank Gehry.

== 1970s ==
- **1979** – Charles Moore designs the Piazza d'Italia in New Orleans.
- **1978** – United Nations City in Vienna, Austria is completed.
- **1977** – The Centre Georges Pompidou in Paris, designed by Renzo Piano, Richard Rogers and Gianfranco Franchini, is opened.
- **1976** – The Barbican Estate, designed by Chamberlin, Powell and Bon, opens in the City of London. The CN Tower in Toronto becomes the tallest freestanding structure in the Western Hemisphere.
- **1975** – Completion of the Seoul Tower in Seoul, South Korea.
- **1974** – National Assembly Building in Dhaka, Bangladesh is completed.
- **1973** – The World Trade Center towers, designed by Minoru Yamasaki, are opened in New York.
- **1972** – The Transamerica Pyramid in San Francisco, California, designed by William Pereira, is completed.
- **1971** – Rothko Chapel in Houston, Texas, designed by Mark Rothko and Philip Johnson is completed.
- **1970** – Construction begins on the Sears Tower in Chicago, designed by Bruce Graham and Fazlur Khan (of Skidmore, Owings & Merrill).

== 1960s ==
- **1969** – Fernsehturm Berlin opens. Ludwig Mies van der Rohe and Walter Gropius die.
- **1968** – Mies van der Rohe's New National Gallery in Berlin finished.
- **1967** – Expo 67 in Montreal features the American pavilion, a geodesic dome designed by Buckminster Fuller, and the Habitat 67 housing complex designed by Moshe Safdie.
- **1966** – The Gateway Arch by Eero Saarinen is finished in St. Louis, Missouri.
- **1965** – NASA's Cape Canaveral VAB, the Niagara Skylon Tower, Philadelphia's LOVE Park, the Tel Aviv Shalom Meir tower and the Salk Institute all open.
- **1964** – The Unisphere heads New York World's Fair.
- **1963** – The Palace of Assembly at Chandigarh, India, is finished.
- **1962** – Orinda Orinda House & by Charles W. Moore is completed.
- **1962** – Seattle Space Needle & TWA Terminal by Saarinen at JFK are opened.
- **1961** – Louis Kahn finishes the Richards Medical Building at the University of Pennsylvania in Philadelphia.
- **1960** – Lucio Costa & Oscar Niemeyer plan buildings of Brasília, new capital of Brazil. The Television Centre for the BBC is opened in London.

== 1950s ==
- **1959** – Frank Lloyd Wright's Guggenheim Museum in New York City is finished after 16 years of work on the project.
- **1958** – The Seagram Building in New York designed by Ludwig Mies van der Rohe and Philip Johnson is completed.
- **1957** – The Interbau 57 exposition in Berlin features structures by Alvar Aalto, Walter Gropius and his The Architects' Collaborative (TAC), and an unité by Le Corbusier.
- **1956** – Crown Hall at the Illinois Institute of Technology, Chicago, designed by Mies van der Rohe, is finished.
- **1955** – Completion of Le Corbusier's Notre Dame du Haut chapel at Ronchamp, France and Disneyland (the world's first theme park) in Anaheim, California.
- **1954** – Louis Kahn finishes his Yale University Art Gallery in New Haven, Connecticut, US.
- **1953** – Completion of the United Nations Headquarters in New York by a design team headed by Wallace Harrison and Max Abramowitz.
- **1952** – Le Corbusier completes his Unité d'Habitation in Marseille.
- **1951** – Mies van der Rohe's Lake Shore Drive Apartments completed in Chicago.
- **1950** – Eames House completed in Santa Monica, California, designed by Charles and Ray Eames.

== 1940s ==
- **1949** – Glass House in New Canaan, Connecticut designed by Philip Johnson.
- **1948** – Pietro Belluschi completes the Equitable Building in Portland, Oregon.
- **1947** – Alvar Aalto builds the Baker House dormitories at the Massachusetts Institute of Technology.
- **1946** – Le Corbusier draws up plans for La Rochelle-La Pallice, while his efforts to redesign Saint-Dié-des-Vosges (both cities in France) are foiled.
- **1945** – John Entenza launches the Case Study Houses Program through his post as editor of Arts & Architecture magazine.
- **1944** – Frank Lloyd Wright builds the research tower for his Johnson Wax Headquarters in Racine, Wisconsin.
- **1943** – Oscar Niemeyer completes his Pampulha project in Brazil.
- **1942** – Vichy rejects Le Corbusier's Obus E plan for Algiers.
- **1941** – Australian War Memorial in Canberra, Australia, completed.
- **1940** – Peter Behrens dies.

== 1930s ==
- **1939** – The 1939 World's Fair in New York includes the Finnish Pavilion by Alvar Aalto and the Brazilian Pavilion by Lucio Costa and Oscar Niemeyer.
- **1938** – Frank Lloyd Wright purchases 800 acres (3.2 km^{2}) of land 26 miles away from Phoenix, and begins to build Taliesin West, his winter home, in Scottsdale, Arizona, US
- **1937** – Wright completes his house Fallingwater, at Bear Run, Pennsylvania.
- **1936** – Frank Lloyd Wright designs his monumental inward-looking Johnson Wax Headquarters in Racine, Wisconsin, US.
- **1935** – Cass Gilbert's United States Supreme Court Building is posthumously finished.
- **1934** – Frank Lloyd Wright draws up plans for his Broadacre City, a decentralized urban metropolis.
- **1933** – The Bauhaus closes under Nazi pressure.
- **1932** – The Museum of Modern Art (MoMA) in New York holds its exhibition on modern architecture, coining the term "International Style."
- **1931** – The Empire State Building, designed by Shreve, Lamb and Harmon, becomes the tallest building in the world.
- **1930** – William Van Alen completes the Chrysler Building, an Art Deco skyscraper in New York City, US.

== 1920s ==
- **1929** – Barcelona Pavilion designed by Ludwig Mies van der Rohe.
- **1929** – Villa Savoye designed by Le Corbusier.
- **1928** – Hector Guimard builds his last house in Paris.
- **1927** – The Weissenhof Estate, an exhibition of apartment houses designed by leading modern architects, held at Stuttgart, Germany.
- **1926** – Bauhaus Dessau building, designed by Walter Gropius, opened. Antoni Gaudí and Louis Majorelle die.
- **1925** – Government House of Thailand, in Bangkok, opened
- **1924** – Gerrit Rietveld completes the Schröder House in Utrecht.
- **1923** – Le Corbusier publishes Vers une architecture (Toward an Architecture), a summary of his ideas.
- **1922** – Monument to the Third International designed by Vladimir Tatlin (unbuilt).
- **1921** – Frank Lloyd Wright completes his Hollyhock House for Aline Barnsdall in Los Angeles, begun in 1917.
- **1920** – The Einstein Tower in Potsdam, designed by Erich Mendelsohn, is completed.

== 1910s ==
- **1919** – Bauhaus design school founded in Weimar, Germany
- **1918** – Birth of Jørn Utzon, designer of the Sydney Opera House.
- **1917** – Georges Biet's Art Nouveau house and apartment building in Nancy, Meurthe-et-Moselle is severely damaged by combat shells, but will be rebuilt nearly exactly as before in 1922.
- **1916** – De Stijl movement founded in the Netherlands.
- **1915** – Le Corbusier completes studies for his Dom-Ino House.
- **1914** – Walter Gropius designs his Fagus Factory.
- **1913** – Cass Gilbert completes the Woolworth Building in New York.
- **1912** – Frank Lloyd Wright begins work on the Avery Coonley Playhouse, Riverside, Illinois.
- **1911** – Josef Hoffmann completes the Stoclet Palace in Brussels.
- **1910** – Gaudí finishes the Casa Milà in Barcelona.

== 1900s ==
- **1909** – Frank Lloyd Wright completes the Robie House near Chicago.
- **1908** – Adolf Loos publishes his essay "Ornament and Crime".
- **1907** – Gaudí completes the Casa Batlló in Barcelona.
- **1906** – Lucien Weissenburger completes his own house, a striking example of the Art Nouveau style in Nancy, Meurthe-et-Moselle.
- **1905** – Wright designs Unity Temple in Oak Park, Illinois.
- **1904** – Otto Wagner completes his Post Office Savings Bank Building in Vienna.
- **1903** – Josef Hoffmann finishes the Moser House in Vienna.
- **1902** – Otto Wagner's Viennese Stadtbahn railway system is completed.
- **1901** – John McArthur Jr., completes the Second Empire-style Philadelphia City Hall, the world's tallest masonry building.
- **1900** – The Gare d'Orsay, later the famous Musée d'Orsay, is built in Paris by Victor Laloux.

== 1890s ==
- **1899** – Hector Guimard is commissioned to design the edicules for the Paris Métropolitain, which have become a hallmark of Art Nouveau design.
- **1898** – Victor Horta designs his own house, later the Horta Museum.
- **1897** – Hendrik Berlage designs his Amsterdam Stock Exchange.
- **1896** – Eugène Vallin completes his own house and studio in Nancy (France), which is the first of many Art Nouveau structures built there by the members of the École de Nancy.
- **1895** – The Biltmore Estate, the largest house in the US, is completed for the Vanderbilt family in Asheville, North Carolina.
- **1894** – Louis Sullivan builds the Guaranty Building in Buffalo, NY, US.
- **1893** – Victor Horta builds what is widely considered the first full-fledged Art Nouveau structure, the Hôtel Tassel, in Brussels.
- **1892** – Birth of Modernist architect Richard Neutra.
- **1891** – Louis Sullivan completes his Wainwright Building in Saint Louis.
- **1890** – Louis Sullivan and Dankmar Adler build the Auditorium Building in Chicago.

== 1880s ==
- **1889** – The 1889 Paris exhibition showcases some of the new technologies of iron, steel, and glass, including the Eiffel Tower.
- **1888** – The Exposición Universal de Barcelona (1888) displays many buildings by Lluís Domènech i Montaner and other Catalan architects.
- **1887** – H. H. Richardson's Marshall Field Store in Chicago is completed.
- **1886** – Birth of Ludwig Mies van der Rohe.
- **1885** – William Le Baron Jenney builds the first metal-frame skyscraper, the Home Insurance Building, in Chicago.
- **1884** – Gaudí is given the commission for the Sagrada Família church in Barcelona, which he will work on until 1926.
- **1883** – Antoni Gaudí completes his Casa Vicens in Barcelona.
- **1881** – The Natural History Museum in London opens.
- **1880** – Cologne Cathedral is finally completed after 632 years.

== 1870s ==
- **1879** – Louis Sullivan joins Dankmar Adler's firm in Chicago.
- **1878** – Work begins on the Herrenchiemsee in Bavaria, designed by Georg Dollman. Death of Sir George Gilbert Scott.
- **1877** – St Pancras railway station in London, by Sir George Gilbert Scott, is completed.
- **1876** – Construction is finished on the Bayreuth Festspielhaus, designed by Gottfried Semper.
- **1875** – The Opéra Garnier is completed in Paris.
- **1874** – Completion of the California State Capitol in Sacramento, California.
- **1873** – Scots' Church in Melbourne, Australia is finished.
- **1872** – The Albert Memorial in London, designed by Sir George Gilbert Scott, is opened.
- **1871** – The Great Chicago Fire destroys most of the city, sparking a building boom there; The Royal Albert Hall is completed in London.
- **1870** – Birth of Adolf Loos.

== 1860s ==
- **1869** – Birth of Georges Biet.
- **1868** – Birth of Peter Behrens and Charles Rennie Mackintosh.
- **1868** – The Gyeongbokgung of Korea is reconstructed.
- **1867** – Birth of Frank Lloyd Wright. William Le Baron Jenney opens his architectural practice in Chicago.
- **1866** – Completion of the St Pancras Hotel in London by Sir George Gilbert Scott.
- **1865** – Birth of French architect Paul Charbonnier.
- **1864** – Birth of French Art Nouveau architect Jules Lavirotte.
- **1863** – United States Capitol building dome in Washington, D.C., is completed.
- **1862** – Construction begins on Henri Labrouste's reading room at the Bibliothèque Nationale de France (site Richelieu).
- **1861** – Birth of Victor Horta.
- **1860** – Construction on Longwood, the largest octagonal residence in the US, is begun in Natchez, Mississippi.

== 1850s ==
- **1859** – Birth of Louis Majorelle and Cass Gilbert.
- **1858** – The competition to design Central Park in New York is won by Frederick Law Olmsted and Calvert Vaux.
- **1857** – Founding of the American Institute of Architects.
- **1856** – Louis Sullivan and Eugène Vallin are born.
- **1855** – The Palais d'Industrie is built for the World's Fair in Paris.
- **1854** – St George's Hall, Liverpool, England is completed by Charles Robert Cockerell to the design of Harvey Lonsdale Elmes.
- **1853** – Baron Haussmann becomes prefect of the Seine département and begins his vast urban renovations of Paris.
- **1852** – Birth of Antoni Gaudí.
- **1851** – The Crystal Palace designed by Joseph Paxton.
- **1850** – Lluis Domènech í Montaner and John W. Root are born.

== 1840s ==
- **1849** – John Ruskin's The Seven Lamps of Architecture is published.
- **1848** – Construction begins on the Washington Monument in Washington, D.C., though it will not be completed until 1885.
- **1847** – 24 August, birth of Charles Follen McKim (died 1909).
- **1846** – 4 September, birth of Daniel Burnham of the firm Burnham and Root.
- **1845** – Trafalgar Square in London, designed by Charles Barry and John Nash, is completed.
- **1844** – Uspensky Cathedral in Kharkiv, Ukraine is completed.
- **1843** – Construction begins on Henri Labrouste's Bibliothèque Sainte-Geneviève in Paris.
- **1842** – The Église de la Madeleine is finally consecrated in Paris as a church.
- **1841** – Birth of Otto Wagner.
- **1840** – Construction begins on the Houses of Parliament in London, designed by Sir Charles Barry and Augustus Welby Northmore Pugin.

== 1830s ==
- **1839** – Birth of Frank Furness in Philadelphia.
- **1838** – Rideau Hall is built by Scottish architect Thomas McKay.
- **1837** – The Royal Institute of British Architects (RIBA) is founded.
- **1836** – A.W.N. Pugin publishes his Contrasts, a treatise on the morality of Catholic, Gothic architecture.
- **1835** – The New Orleans Mint, Dahlonega Mint, and Charlotte Mint are all designed by William Strickland and begin producing. coins in three years.
- **1834** – Alfred B. Mullet, designer of both the San Francisco and the Carson City Mints in the US, is born in Britain.
- **1833** – William Strickland completes the first Philadelphia Mint building.
- **1832** – Birth of William Le Baron Jenney.
- **1830** – The Altes Museum in Berlin, designed by Karl Friedrich Schinkel, is completed after seven years of construction.

== 1820s ==
- **1829** – The panopticon-design Eastern State Penitentiary in Philadelphia, designed by John Havilland, opens.
- **1828** – Completion of the Marble Arch in London, designed by John Nash.
- **1827** – Birth of British Gothic Revial architect William Burges.
- **1826** – The Menai Suspension Bridge over the Menai Strait, in Wales, designed by Thomas Telford, is completed.
- **1825** – The front and rear porticoes of the White House are added to the building.
- **1824** – The Shelbourne Hotel in Dublin, Ireland is completed.
- **1823** – Work begins on the British Museum in London, designed by (Sir) Robert Smirke.
- **1822** – Birth of landscape architect Frederick Law Olmsted.
- **1821** – Karl Friedrich Schinkel completeds his Schauspielhaus in Berlin and Benjamin Latrobe's Baltimore Basilica is completed.
- **1820** – Death of Benjamin Latrobe.

== 1810s ==
- **1819** – Birth of English architect Horace Jones.
- **1818** – Birth of American architect James Renwick Jr.
- **1817** – Dulwich Picture Gallery in London is designed by Sir John Soane as the first purpose-built art gallery.
- **1816** – Regent's Bridge, crossing the River Thames in central London, designed by James Walker, is opened.
- **1815** – Brighton Pavilion is redesigned by John Nash for the future King George IV.
- **1814** – British troops burn the White House in Washington, D.C., gutting it completely.
- **1813** – Death of Alexandre-Théodore Brongniart.
- **1812** – The Egyptian Hall in London, designed by P. F. Robinson, is completed.
- **1811** – The United States Capitol, designed by Benjamin Latrobe, is completed. Birth of George Gilbert Scott.
- **1810** – Old Saint Petersburg Stock Exchange, designed by Jean-François Thomas de Thomon, is completed.

== 1800s ==
- **1809** – Birth of city planner Baron Haussmann.
- **1808** – Construction begins on the Paris Bourse, designed by Alexandre-Théodore Brongniart.
- **1807** – The Templo de la Virgen del Carmen in Celaya, Guanajuato, Mexico is completed.
- **1806** – Arc de Triomphe, Paris from Jean-François Chalgrin commissioned by Napoleon Bonaparte.
- **1805** – The Ellesmere Canal, designed by Thomas Telford, is completed.
- **1804** – Completion of the Government House in the Bahamas.
- **1803** – The Raj Bhavan in Kolkata, West Bengal, India is finished.
- **1802** – The Temple of Saint Philip Neri in Guadalajara, Jalisco, Mexico is completed.
- **1801** – Birth of Henri Labrouste.
- **1800** – The White House in Washington, D.C. is completed by team of client George Washington, planner Pierre L'Enfant, and architect James Hoban.

== 1790s ==
- **1799** – Death of French neoclassicist Étienne-Louis Boullée.
- **1798** – Karlsruhe Synagogue, usually regarded as the first building of the Egyptian Revival architecture, built by Friedrich Weinbrenner in Karlsruhe.
- **1797** – Ditherington Flax Mill, in Shrewsbury, England, the world's oldest surviving iron-framed building, is completed.
- **1796** – Somerset House in London, designed by William Chambers, is completed.
- **1795** – Birth of English architect Charles Barry.
- **1794** – Hwaseong Fortress in Suwon, Korea, begins.
- **1793** – Old East, the oldest public uniir John Soane's Museum.
- **1791** – Brandenburg Gate in Berlin is completed
- **1790** –

== 1780s ==
- **1789** – Jacques-Germain Soufflot's Panthéon in Paris is completed by his student Jean-Baptiste Rondelet.
- **1788** –
- **1787** –
- **1786** – Schloss Bellevue in Berlin, designed by Philipp Daniel Boumann, is completed.
- **1785** –
- **1784** –
- **1783** –
- **1782** – Alexandre-Théodore Brongniart is named architect and controller-general of the École Militaire in Paris.
- **1781** –
- **1780** – 29 August – Death of Jacques-Germain Soufflot (b. 1713).

== 1770s ==
- **1779** – Fridericianum in Kassel (Hesse), designed by Simon Louis du Ry, completed.
- **1778** – La Scala opera house in Milan (Lombardy), designed by Giuseppe Piermarini, is opened
- **1777** –
- **1776** –
- **1775** –
- **1774** –
- **1773** –
- **1772** –
- **1771** –
- **1770** –

== 1760s ==
- **1769** – St Clement's Church, Moscow is completed
- **1768** – Petit Trianon at Versailles is completed.
- **1767** – Arg of Karim Khan
- **1766** – Horace Walpole's Strawberry Hill House in London is completed.
- **1765** –
- **1764** – Construction begins on church of La Madeleine, Paris.
- **1763** –
- **1762** –
- **1761** –
- **1760** –

== 1750s ==
- **1759** – Royal Palace of Riofrío in Spain, designed by Virgilio Rabaglio completed.
- **1758** – The royal water garden of Taman Sari (Yogyakarta) on Java, designed by Tumenggung Mangundipura, is begun.
- **1757** – Vorontsov Palace (Saint Petersburg), designed by Francesco Bartolomeo Rastrelli, is completed.
- **1756** –
- **1755** – Nuruosmaniye Mosque in Istanbul, designed by Mustafa Ağa and Simeon Kalfa, is completed
- **1754** – Tomb of Safdar Jang in Delhi is completed.
- **1753** – The Georgian-Style Pennsylvania State House, (Independence Hall) is completed in Philadelphia, Pennsylvania.
- **1752** – Valletta Waterfront on Malta is built
- **1751** –
- **1750** – Rang Ghar in eastern India.

== 1740s ==
- **1749** – The Radcliffe Camera in Oxford, England, designed by James Gibbs, is opened as a library.
- **1748** –
- **1747** –
- **1746** –
- **1745** –
- **1744** –
- **1743** – Dresden Frauenkirche, Dresden, Germany, completed.
- **1742** –
- **1741** –
- **1740** –

== 1730s ==
- **1739** – Birth of Alexandre-Théodore Brongniart.
- **1738** –
- **1737** –
- **1736** –
- **1735** – Buckingham Palace built
- **1734** –
- **1733** –
- **1732** –
- **1731** – Basilica of Superga in the vicinity of Turin built, and designed by Filippo Juvarra
- **1730** –

== 1720s ==
- **1729** – Christ Church, Spitalfields in London is completed.
- **1728** –
- **1727** –
- **1726** – The remaining ruins of Liverpool Castle are demolished.
- **1725** –
- **1724** – The construction of Blenheim Palace is completed.
- **1723** – Mavisbank House in Loanhead, Scotland is designed. Death of Christopher Wren.
- **1722** –
- **1721** –
- **1720** –

== 1710s ==
- **1719** –
- **1718** –
- **1717** –
- **1716** –
- **1715** –
- **1714** –
- **1713** – Vizianagaram Fort in South India is built.
- **1712** –
- **1711** –
- **1710** –

== 1700s ==
- **1709** –
- **1708** – St. Paul's Cathedral in London, designed by Christopher Wren, is completed.
- **1707** –
- **1706** –
- **1705** – November: In Williamsburg, capital of the Virginia colony in America, construction of the Capitol building is completed.
- **1704** – St Magnus-the-Martyr in London is completed.
- **1703** –
- **1702** – The Thomaskirche in Leipzig, Germany is completed.
- **1701** –
- **1700** –

== 17th century ==
- **1690s** – Potala Palace is completed in Tibet.
- **1690s** – The city of Noto, Italy, on Sicily, is devastated by an earthquake (1693), and a rebuilding program begins in the Baroque style.
- **1680s** – Church of Les Invalides, Paris is built by Jules Hardouin-Mansart.
- **1670s** – The Royal Greenwich Observatory in London, designed by Christopher Wren is completed (1676).
- **1660s** – Louis XIV, with the architect Jules Hardouin-Mansart, begins to enlarge the Palace of Versailles (1661); foundation stone of Petersberg Citadel, Erfurt, Germany laid (1665).
- **1650s** – Completion of the church Sant'Agnese in Agone in Rome, designed by Borromini and Carlo Rainaldi.
- **1640s** – Borromini builds the church Sant'Ivo alla Sapienza in Rome.
- **1630s** – Emperor Shah Jahan construct Taj Mahal in Agra, India.
- **1630s** – Borromini builds the church San Carlo alle Quattro Fontane in Rome.
- **1620s** – St. Peter's Basilica is completed in Vatican City (1626).
- **1610s** – Mohammadreza Isfahani builds Naghsh-i Jahan Square in Isfahan, Iran.
- **1600s** – 33 pol bridge is constructed in Isfahan, Iran.

== 16th century ==
- **1590s** – Bernini and Borromini are born.
- **1580s** –
- **1570s** –
- **1560s** – work begins on Palladio's Villa Capra "La Rotonda".
- **1550s** –
- **1540s** –
- **1530s** – Work begins on Michelangelo's Piazza del Campidoglio (Capitoline Hill).
- **1520s** – Santhome Church was built in Chennai.
- **1510s** – Construction begins on Chateau Chambord.
- **1500s** – Construction begins on St. Peter's Basilica. Birth of Andrea Palladio.

== 15th century ==
- **1490s** –
- **1480s** – Vitruvius' treatise De architectura and Leon Battista Alberti's De re aedificatoria were published, having previously existed only in manuscript.
- **1470s** –
- **1460s** –
- **1450s** – Architecture of the Ottoman Empire after capturing Constantinople
- **1440s** –
- **1430s** –
- **1420s** – The Forbidden City of China is completed
- **1410s** –
- **1400s** – The Changdeokgung of Korea is completed.

== 14th century ==
- **14th Century architecture**

== 13th century ==
- **1290s** –
- **1280s** –
- **1270s** – St. Augustine's Monastery (Erfurt), Germany begun 1277
- **1260s** – Fakr Ad-Din Mosque is finished in the Sultanate of Mogadishu
- **1250s** –
- **1240s** – The foundation stone of Cologne Cathedral in Cologne is laid.
- **1230s** –
- **1220s** –
- **1210s** –
- **1200s** –

== 12th century ==
- **1190s** – Construction of Qutb Minar started in India
- **1190s** – Construction begins on the present form of Chartres Cathedral after a fire.
- **1180s** –
- **1170s** –
- **1160s** –
- **1150s** –
- **1140s** – Abbot Sugar supervises the reconstruction of St. Denis in the Gothic style
- **1130s** – Work begins on the Basilica of Saint-Denis in France.
- **1120s** –
- **1110s** –
- **1100s** – Yingzao Fashi written by Li Jie published during mid Song dynasty, an important set of building standards.

== 11th century ==
- **1090s** – Durham Cathedral founded; Old Synagogue (Erfurt), Germany, one of the oldest synagogue buildings in Europe (1094)
- **1080s** –
- **1070s** – St Albans Cathedral commenced; built from the ruins of Roman Verulamium.
- **1060s** –
- **1050s** – Greensted Church built, oldest surviving wooden church (extensively repaired) in the world, possibly the oldest wooden building in Europe.
- **1040s** –
- **1030s** – Gangaikonda Cholapuram built by the kingdom of Rajendra Chola I under Chola dynasty.
- **1020s** –
- **1010s** –
- **1000s** – Brihadisvara Temple built by the kingdom of Rajaraja I under Chola dynasty. Construction of stone buildings in Great Zimbabwe begins.

== 1st millennium AD ==
- 905 – Aachen Cathedral consecrated (major renovations in the 10th century).
- **900s** – Akhtala Monastery built, intended as a fortress.
- **800s** –
- 880 – The Nea Ekklesia is inaugurated in Constantinople, setting the model for all later cross-in-square Orthodox churches.
- 851 – Great Mosque of Samarra is completed in Samarra
- 848 – San Miguel de Lillo built in the Asturian pre-romanesque style of Spain.
- 785 – Great Mosque of Córdoba is completed
- 715 – Umayyad Mosque is completed
- **700s** – Seokguram of Korea is constructed.
- 692 – Dome of the Rock is constructed.
- 605 – Anji Bridge, China, the world's oldest known open-spandrel segmental stone arch bridge, is completed.
- **600s** – St. Hripsime Church, Echmiadzin, one of the world's oldest surviving churches, constructed.
- **500s** – Hagia Sophia built in its present form. Oldest known surviving roof truss in Saint Catherine's Monastery.
- 495–504 – Basilica of Sant'Apollinare Nuovo, Ravenna.
- 470 – Basilica of St. Martin, Tours.
- 432–40 – Santa Maria Maggiore and Santa Sabina in Rome.
- **400s** – Mahabalipuram, an ancient port city of south east India, constructed under Mahendravarman I & his son Narasimhavarman I of the Pallava Kingdom, Tamil Nadu, South India.
- 391 – Serapeum of Alexandria is destroyed in a conflict between Christians and pagans.
- c.330 – Basilica of Saint Paul Outside the Walls, Rome.
- 325 – Old St. Peter's Basilica, Rome.
- 320 – Construction of Archbasilica of Saint John Lateran, Rome, begun using standards that will be followed in future basilica designs.
- 315 – Arch of Constantine in Rome dedicated to the Battle of Milvian Bridge.
- 312 – Aula Palatina (Basilica of Constantine) at Trier, the brick audience hall, completed.
- 307–312 – Basilica of Maxentius and Catacomb of the Via Latina in Rome begun.
- **300s** – Nalanda, an ancient center of higher learning, is built in Gupta Empire in India.
- 296–306 – Baths of Diocletian in Rome.
- 262 – Arch of Gallienus in Rome completed.
- 231 – Dura-Europos church in Syria, a house built c.200 converted into a Christian Church.
- 224 – Dura-Europos synagogue one of the oldest synagogues.
- 211 – Arch of Drusus in Rome completed.
- 203 – Arch of Septimius Severus in Rome completed.
- 212–16 – Baths of Caracalla in Rome.
- **200s** –
- 200 – Pyramid of the Sun in Teotihuacan is constructed.
- 193 – Column of Marcus Aurelius dedicated in Rome.
- 134 – Ponte Sant'Angelo across the Tiber in Rome completed.
- 118–28 – Pantheon, Rome is completed, an early full dome.
- 113 – Trajan's Column in Rome dedicated.
- 104–6 – Alcántara Bridge, a Roman multiple arched bridge over the Tagus River in Spain.
- 82 – Arch of Titus in Rome an artifact from the 'Temple Period' and the beginning of the Jewish Diaspora.
- **100s** – Pantheon, Rome is completed.
- 70–80 – Colosseum in Rome built under Emperors Vespasian and Titus.
- 60–69 – Domus Aurea in Rome begun.
- 52 – Porta Maggiore (Porta Prenestina) in Rome built. A subterranean Neopythagorean basilica nearby also dates to this century.
- 47–50 – Romans establish the city of Londinium in Britain.
- 40 – Lighthouse at Boulogne built.
- 3 – Gungnae City of Goguryeo completed.

== 1st millennium BC ==
- **1-99 BC** – Vitruvius writes De architectura (c. 15 BC). Expansion of Herod the Great's temple begins (c. 37 BC). Pont du Gard (c. 50 BC), Provence, France. Pons Fabricius, oldest functional stone Roman bridge in Rome, Italy (62 BC). Maison Carrée Roman temple is constructed (c. 16 BC). Mausoleum of Augustus is completed (28 BC).
- **100s** – Across the Tiber in Italy: Ponte Milvio is the second bridge at this location (115 BC); Pons Aemilius is the oldest stone Roman bridge in Rome (126 BC).
- **200s** – Erechtheion in Athens completed (206 BC). Lighthouse of Alexandria in Egypt completed and is the tallest man-made structure in existence at the time (c. 246 BC). The city of Djenné-Djenno is first occupied (250 BC). Colossus of Rhodes is completed (280 BC).
- **300s** – University of ancient Taxila, one of the first institutes of learning, is established. Mausoleum at Halicarnassus, one of the Seven Wonders of the Ancient World, is completed (350 BC). Alexander the Great founds the city of Alexandria and plans its layout (331 BC). The city of Antioch is founded (300 BC).
- **400s** – Completion of the final form of the Parthenon in Athens (432 BC). Construction of Pataliputra (modern day Patna) in the Magadha empire (Indian subcontinent) begun (490 BC).
- **500s** – Construction of the Temple of Artemis in Ephesus begins (c. 500 BC). Second Temple in Jerusalem completed (February 25, 515 BC). Work begins on Persepolis (515 BC). Temple of Jupiter Optimus Maximus completed in Rome (509 BC).
- **600s** – Port city of Naucratis is founded in Egypt (c. 625 BC). Massalia (modern-day Marseille) is founded (c. 600 BC).
- **700s** – According to legend, the city of Rome is founded (753 BC).
- **800s** –
- **900s** – The earliest Greek temple built at Samos with some timber framing based on the Mycenaean megaron

== 2nd millennium BC ==
- **1000s BC** –
- **1100s** –
- **1200s** – Chogha Zanbil built. End of Harappan architecture
- **1300s** –
- **1400s** –
- **1500s** –
- **1600s** – Final construction of Stonehenge in England
- **1700s** –
- **1800s** – Last Egyptian pyramid built in Hawara
- **1900s** –

== 3rd millennium BC ==
- **2000s BC** – Ziggurat of Ur construction takes place
- **2100s** –
- **2200s** –
- **2300s** –
- **2400s** –
- **2500s** –
- **2600s** – Ancient city of Mohenjo-daro is built in modern-day Pakistan. Great Pyramid of Giza and Pyramid of Djoser built in Egypt.
- **2700s** –
- **2800s** –
- **2900s** – (2900 – 1600 BC) the Longshan culture in China. Examples in Shandong, Henan, and southern Shaanxi and Shanxi provinces.

== Neolithic ==
- **4th millennium BC** – Harappa ancient city built.
- **5th millennium BC** – (5000–3000 BC) Yangshao culture in China.
- **6th millennium BC** – (6000–2000 BC) Emergence of wooden frames in Chinese architecture including the use of mortise and tenon joinery to build wood beamed houses.
- **7th millennium BC** – Çatalhöyük in Anatolia constructed without streets.
- **8th millennium BC** – Lahuradewa architecture in Ganges plains of India. Early Mehrgarh settlements are established near the Bolan Pass in Pakistan. Earliest town sites with simple residential neighbourhoods in Jarmo, Jericho, and Ain Ghazal on the Levant.
- **10th millennium BC** – Göbekli Tepe in Turkey, an ancient structure believed to be the first place of worship.

== See also ==
- Table of years in architecture
- Timeline of architectural styles
- Outline of architecture
- History of architecture
