= 1757 in architecture =

List of years in architecture	(table)
- … 1747; 1748; 1749; 1750; 1751; 1752; 1753; 1754; 1755; 1756; 1757; 1758; 1759; 1760; 1761; 1762; 1763; 1764; 1765; 1766; 1767 …
- Buildings and structures: Art; Archaeology; Architecture; Literature; Music; Philosophy; Science; +...

The year 1757 in architecture involved some significant events.

== Buildings and structures ==
=== Buildings ===
- Frederiks Hospital, Copenhagen, is opened.
- Middlesex Hospital, London, is opened.
- Vorontsov Palace (Saint Petersburg), designed by Francesco Bartolomeo Rastrelli, is completed.
- Gammel Holtegård near Copenhagen is completed by architect Lauritz de Thurah as a house for himself.
- Hôtel d'Esmivy de Moissac in Aix-en-Provence is completed with a façade designed by Georges Vallon.
- Nuthall Temple in Nottinghamshire, England, a Palladian house attributed to the polymath Thomas Wright, is completed.
- Swinfen Hall in Staffordshire, England, designed by Benjamin Wyatt, is built.
- Church of the Dormition of the Theotokos, Negoslavci in Croatia is completed.
- Wolvendaal Church in Colombo (Dutch Ceylon) is completed.
- Ossian's Hall of Mirrors in Scotland, a folly, is built.

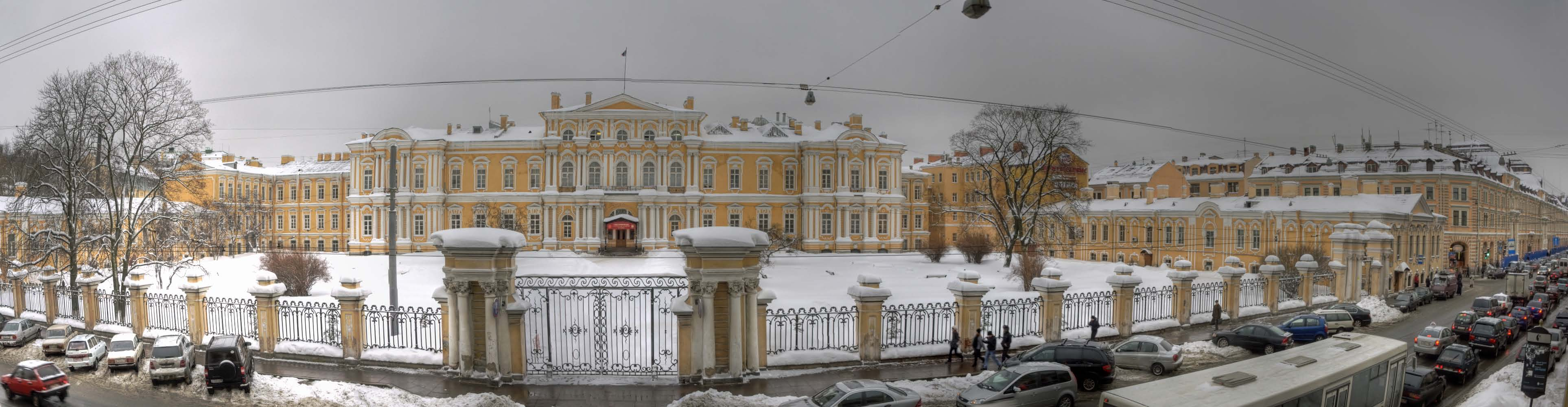
Vorontsov Palace (Saint Petersburg)

== Publications ==
- William Chambers – Designs of Chinese Buildings, furniture, dresses, machines, and utensils: to which is annexed a description of their temples, houses, gardens, &c. (London)

== Births ==
- January 16 – Samuel McIntire, American architect (died 1811)
- May 4 – Manuel Tolsá, Spanish architect and sculptor working in Mexico (died 1816)
- August 9 – Thomas Telford, British civil engineer (died 1834)

== Deaths ==
- March 12 – Giuseppe Galli Bibiena, Italian architect and painter (born 1696)
