= 1759 in architecture =

List of years in architecture	(table)
- … 1749; 1750; 1751; 1752; 1753; 1754; 1755; 1756; 1757; 1758; 1759; 1760; 1761; 1762; 1763; 1764; 1765; 1766; 1767; 1768; 1769 …
- Buildings and structures: Art; Archaeology; Architecture; Literature; Music; Philosophy; Science; +...

The following architectural events occurred in the year 1759.

== Events ==
- Work begins on Harewood House in Yorkshire, England, designed by John Carr and Robert Adam.

== Buildings and structures ==
=== Buildings completed ===
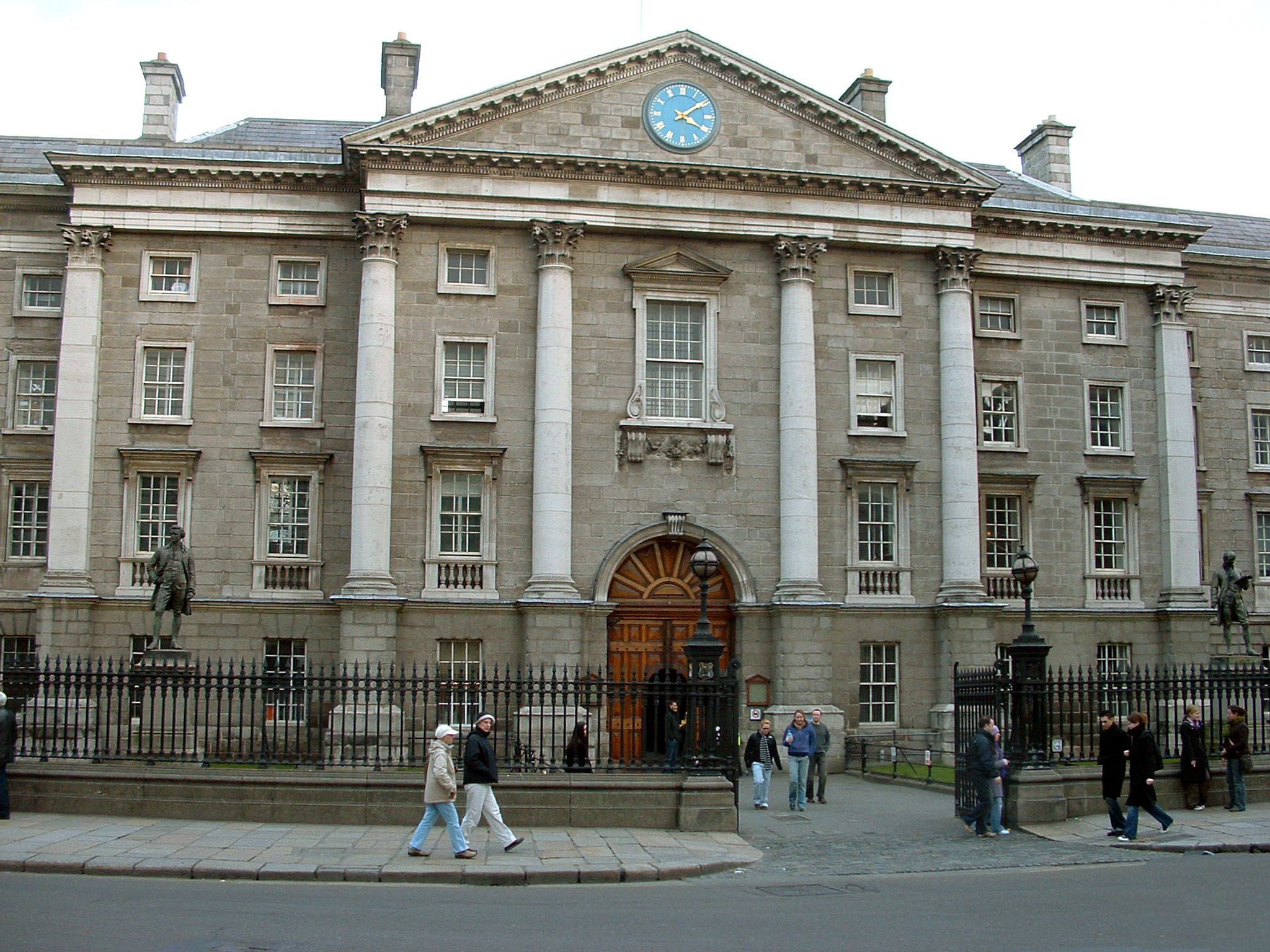
Trinity College Dublin

- Dumfries House in Scotland, designed by Robert Adam.
- West front of Trinity College Dublin (Ireland) on College Green, designed by Henry Keene and John Sanderson.
- Royal Palace of Riofrío in Spain, designed by Virgilio Rabaglio.

== Births ==
- January 21 – François Baillairgé, French Canadian architect, painter and sculptor (died 1830)
- May 20 – William Thornton, physician, inventor, painter and architect, first Architect of the Capitol (died 1828)

== Deaths ==
- June 3 – Carlo Francesco Dotti, Bolognese architect (born 1670)
