= 1750 in architecture =

List of years in architecture	(table)
- … 1740; 1741; 1742; 1743; 1744; 1745; 1746; 1747; 1748; 1749; 1750; 1751; 1752; 1753; 1754; 1755; 1756; 1757; 1758; 1759; 1760 …
- Buildings and structures: Art; Archaeology; Architecture; Literature; Music; Philosophy; Science; +...

The year 1750 in architecture involved some significant events.

== Events ==
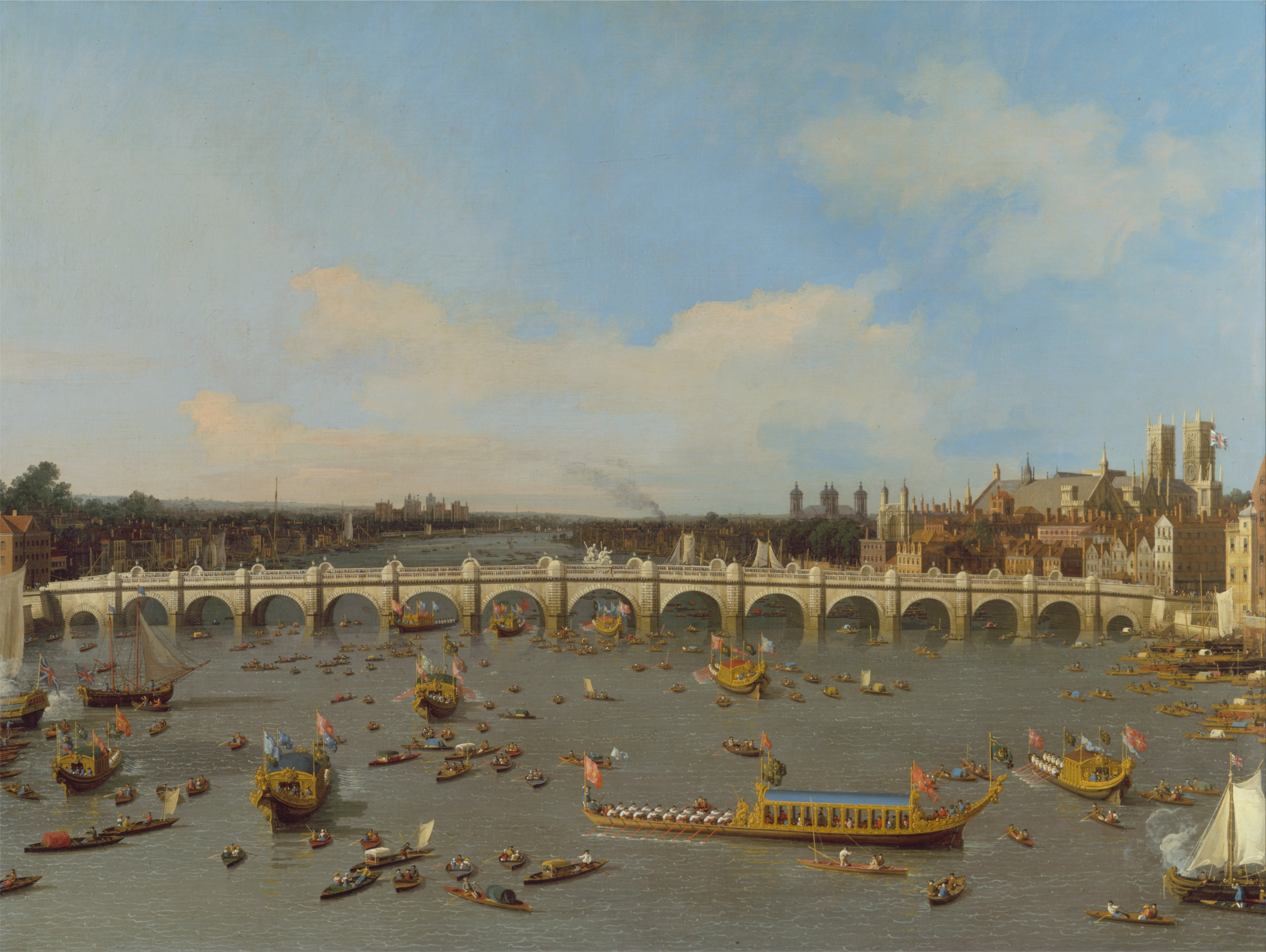
Westminster Bridge, painted by Canaletto before completion

- November 18 – Westminster Bridge across the River Thames in London, designed by Swiss-born engineer Charles Labelye, is officially opened.
- Kedleston Hall in Derbyshire, England, is commissioned by Sir Nathaniel Curzon (later 1st Baron Scarsdale), to be designed by James Paine and Matthew Brettingham.
- Calcot Park, Berkshire, England, is rebuilt by John Blagrave, following a fire.
- William Halfpenny publishes Rural Architecture in the Chinese Taste in England.

== Buildings and structures ==
=== Buildings ===
- Azm Palace, Damascus
- Christoffel Vought Farmstead, New Jersey
- Preservation Hall, a private residence in the New Orleans French Quarter (it will serve as a tavern during the War of 1812)
- Fort Rensellear in Canajoharie, New York

== Births ==
- January 21 – François Baillairgé, architect, painter and sculptor (died 1830)
- May 20 – William Thornton, British-American physician, inventor, painter and architect (died 1828)
- date unknown – John Booth, architect and surveyor (died 1843)
- probable – Thomas Baldwin, English surveyor and architect in Bath (died 1820)

== Deaths ==
- September 5 – Lauritz de Thurah, Danish architect and architectural writer (born 1706)
