= 1758 in architecture =

List of years in architecture	(table)
- … 1748; 1749; 1750; 1751; 1752; 1753; 1754; 1755; 1756; 1757; 1758; 1759; 1760; 1761; 1762; 1763; 1764; 1765; 1766; 1767; 1768 …
- Buildings and structures: Art; Archaeology; Architecture; Literature; Music; Philosophy; Science; +...

The year 1758 in architecture involved some significant events.

== Events ==
- Foundations of a new Church of Sainte-Geneviève in Paris, designed by Jacques-Germain Soufflot, are begun; the structure will be completed in 1790 by his pupil Jean-Baptiste Rondelet to serve as the Panthéon.

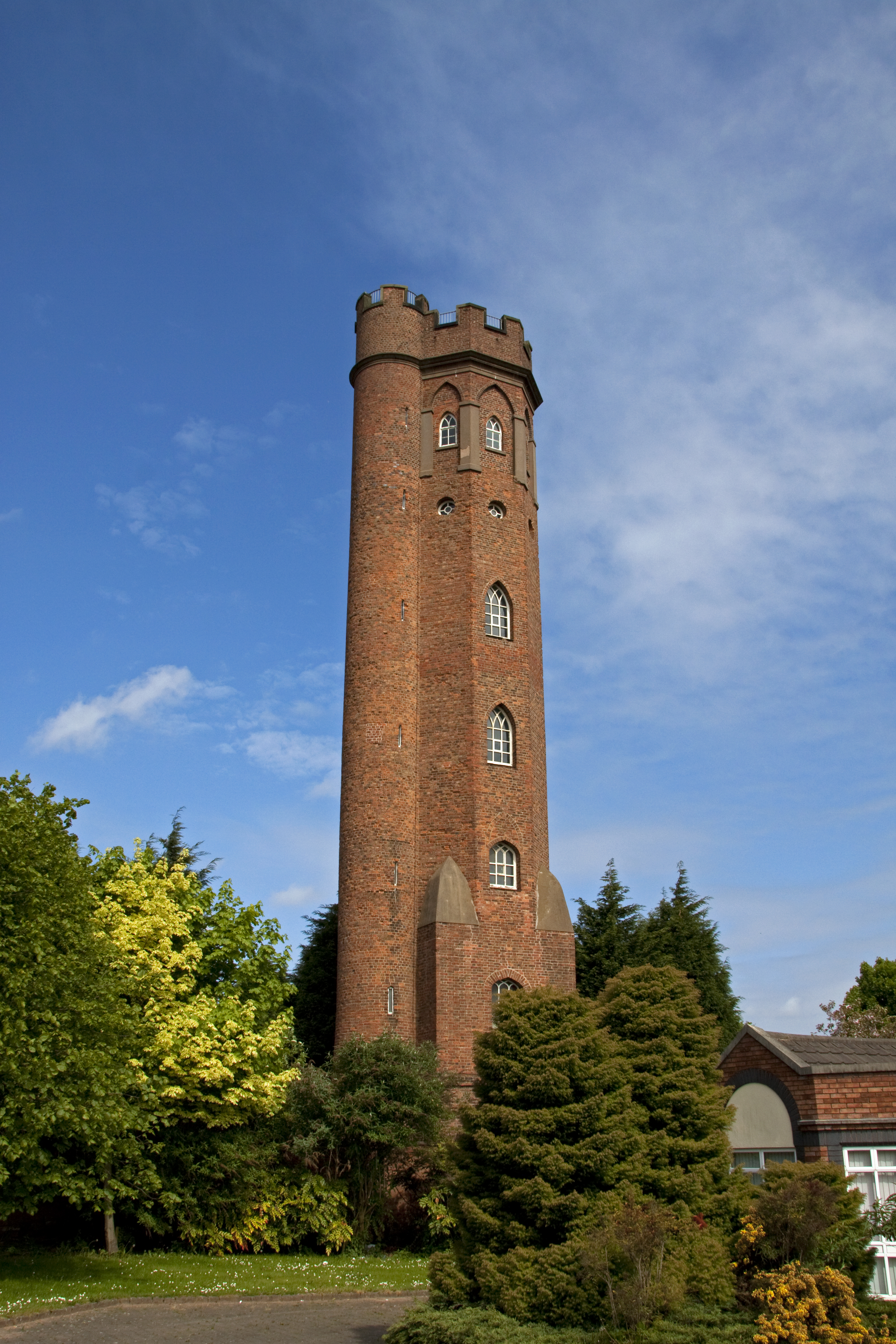
Perrott's Folly

== Buildings and structures ==
=== Buildings ===
- Perrott's Folly in Edgbaston, Birmingham, England is completed.
- The Shire Hall, Warwick, England, designed by Sanderson Miller, is completed.
- The royal water garden of Taman Sari (Yogyakarta) on Java, designed by Tumenggung Mangundipura, is begun.

== Births ==
- Charles Wyatt, English architect working in India (died 1819)
- Approximate date – Francesco Piranesi, Italian-born architectural engraver and architect (died 1810)

== Deaths ==
- February 10 – Thomas Ripley, English architect (born c.1683)
- April 21 – Francesco Zerafa, Maltese architect (born 1679)
