= 1751 in architecture =

List of years in architecture	(table)
- … 1741; 1742; 1743; 1744; 1745; 1746; 1747; 1748; 1749; 1750; 1751; 1752; 1753; 1754; 1755; 1756; 1757; 1758; 1759; 1760; 1761 …
- Buildings and structures: Art; Archaeology; Architecture; Literature; Music; Philosophy; Science; +...

The year 1751 in architecture involved some significant events.

== Events ==
- June 29 – Foundations of Santo Domingo convent in Buenos Aires, designed by Antonio Masella Turin (construction completed in 1805), are laid.

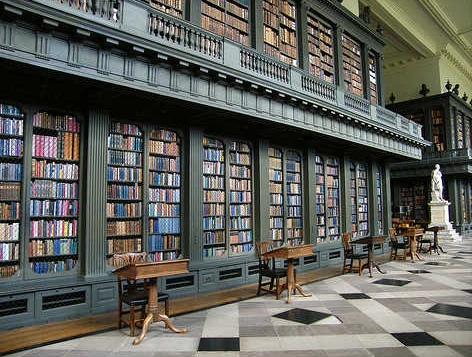
Codrington Library, Oxford

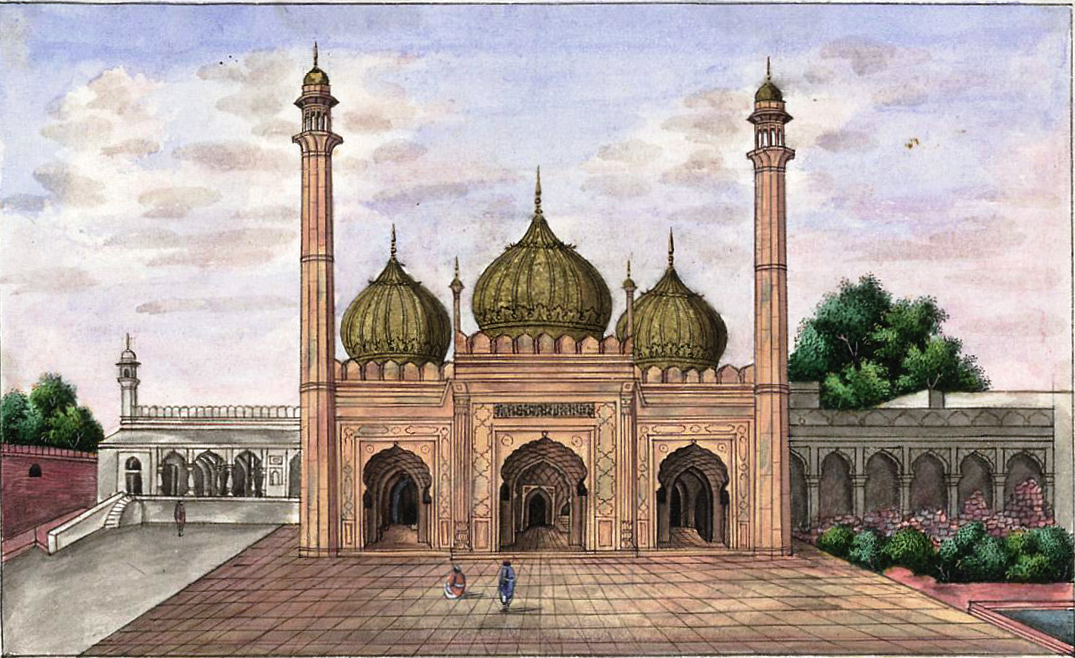
Sunehri Masjid, Delhi

== Buildings and structures ==
=== Buildings ===
- Dresden Cathedral in Saxony, designed by Gaetano Chiaveri (construction begun in 1738), is completed.
- Church of St. Michael in Berg am Laim, Munich in Bavaria, designed by Johann Michael Fischer (construction begun in 1738), is completed.
- Pilgrimage Church of Maria Schnee, Aufhausen in Bavaria, designed by Johann Michael Fischer (construction begun in 1736), is completed.
- Crossmichael Parish Church in south west Scotland (construction begun in 1749) is completed.
- The Kalvária Banská Štiavnica calvary in the Kingdom of Hungary (construction begun in 1744) is completed.
- The Sunehri Masjid ("Golden Mosque") in the Red Fort of Old Delhi, India (construction begun in 1747) is completed.
- Second Old Ursuline Convent, New Orleans, designed by Ignace François Broutin (construction begun in 1745), is completed.
- Codrington Library at All Souls College, Oxford, designed by Nicholas Hawksmoor (construction begun in 1716), is completed.
- Prince William Mansion, Copenhagen, is completed.
- Dutch House at Kuskovo near Moscow, designed by Y. I. Kologrivov (construction begun in 1749), is completed.

== Births ==
- May 20 – Jonathan Williams, American military engineer (d. 1815)

== Deaths ==
- January 6 – Carl Marcus Tuscher, German-born Danish portrait painter, printmaker, architect and decorator (born 1705)
- February 8 – Nicola Salvi, Italian architect (b. 1697)
- February 19 – Richard Cassels, German-born architect working in Ireland (b. 1690)
- March 3 – Batty Langley, English garden designer and pioneer of Gothic Revival architecture (b. 1696)
- August 9 – Ignace François Broutin, French military officer and architect in Louisiana (b. 1690)
- December 18 – Kilian Ignaz Dientzenhofer, Bohemian baroque architect (b. 1689)
