= 1752 in architecture =

| List of years in architecture | (table) |
- … 1742; 1743; 1744; 1745; 1746; 1747; 1748; 1749; 1750; 1751; 1752; 1753; 1754; 1755; 1756; 1757; 1758; 1759; 1760; 1761; 1762 …
- Buildings and structures: Art; Archaeology; Architecture; Literature; Music; Philosophy; Science; +...

The year 1752 in architecture involved some significant events.

== Buildings and structures ==
=== Buildings ===
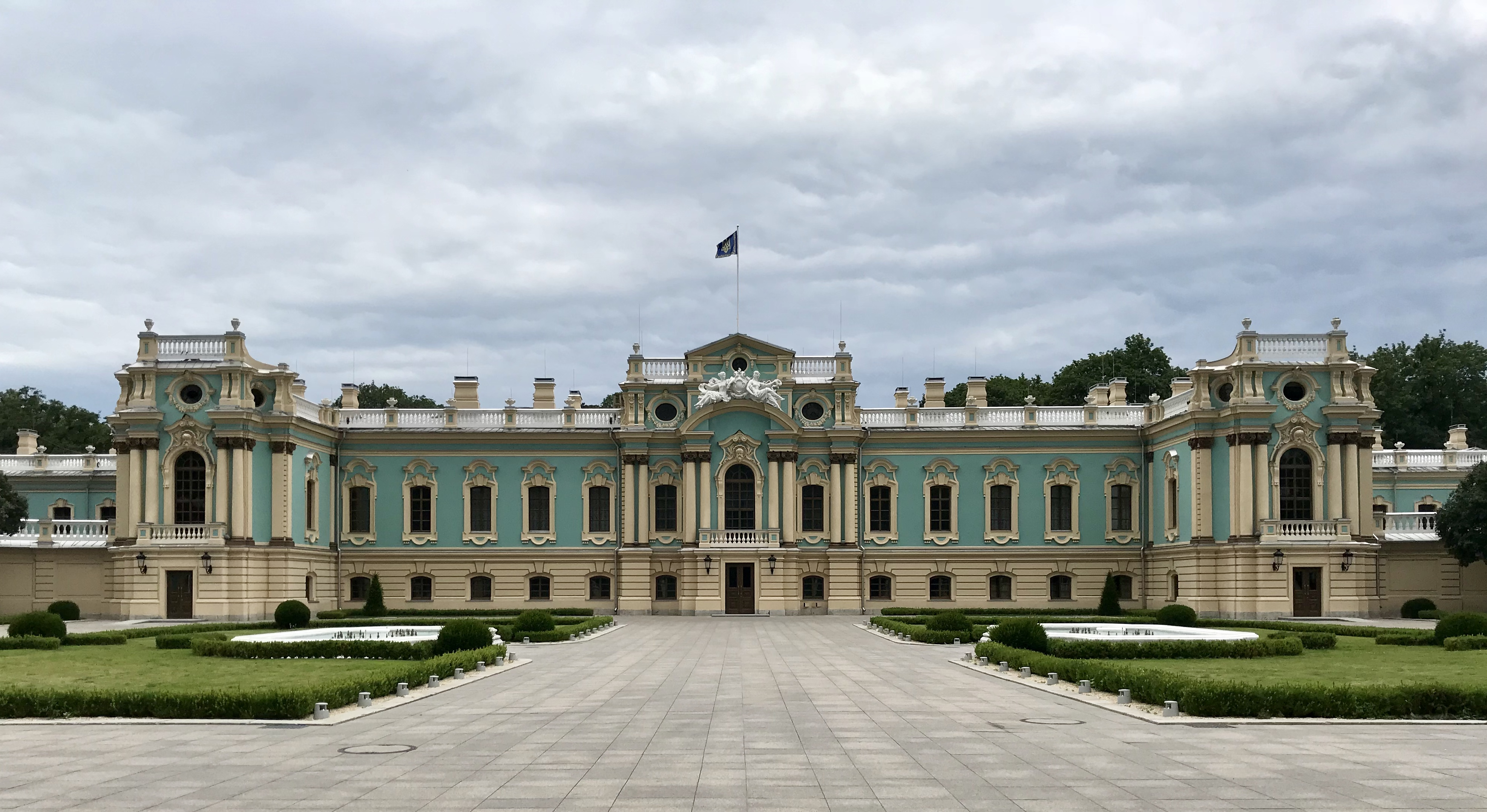
Mariinskyi Palace in Kyiv, Russian Empire

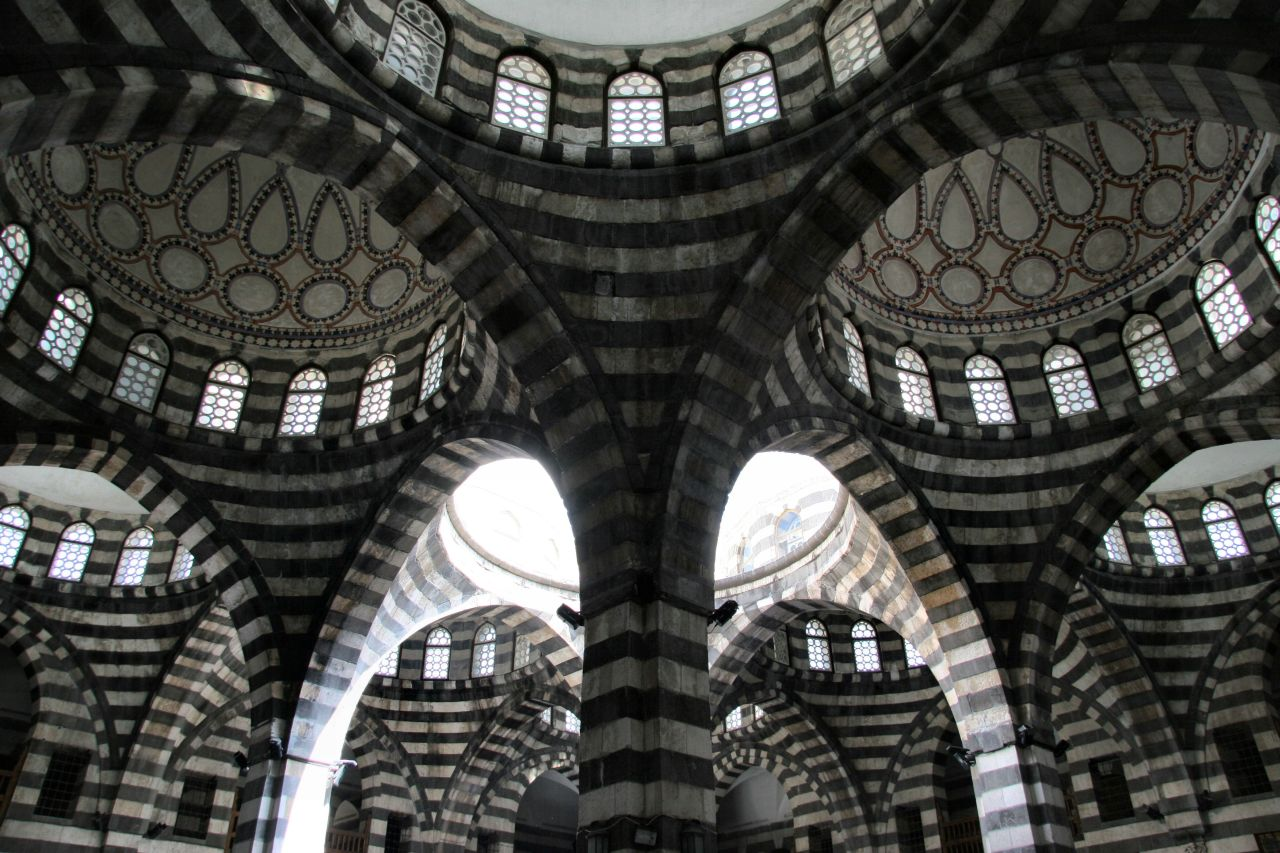
Khan As'ad Pasha

- Valletta Waterfront on Malta is built, including the Church of the Flight into Egypt.
- Mansion House, London, designed by George Dance the Elder, is completed.
- West wing of St Bartholomew's Hospital, London, designed by James Gibbs, is built.
- Mariinskyi Palace in Kyiv is completed by Ivan Fyodorovich Michurin to the design of Francesco Bartolomeo Rastrelli.
- Khan As'ad Pasha, Damascus is completed.
- Rebuilding of church of San Biagio, Venice, probably by Filippo Rossi, is completed.
- Church of La Visitation-de-la-Bienheureuse-Vierge-Marie on the island of Montreal, designed by Philippe Liébert is consecrated.
- Opéra-Théâtre de Metz Métropole in Metz, Lorraine, designed by Jacques Oger (begun 1732) is opened.
- Osteiner Hof in Mainz (Rhineland), designed by Johann Valentin Thomann, is completed.
- Croome Court in Worcestershire, England, designed by Capability Brown and Sanderson Miller, is completed.
- Pollok House near Glasgow in Scotland, designed by William Adam is built.
- Kinbuck Bridge in Scotland is built.
- Hôtel de Ville, Wissembourg in France is inaugurated

== Births ==
- January 18 – John Nash, English architect (died 1835)
- March 5 – Leendert Viervant the Younger, Dutch architect (died 1801)
- Charles-Louis Balzac, French architect and architectural draughtsman (died 1820)

== Deaths ==
- João Frederico Ludovice, born Johann Friedrich Ludwig, German architect working in Portugal (born 1670)
- Daniel Marot, French émigré architect and interior designer (born 1661)
