= 1753 in architecture =

List of years in architecture	(table)
- … 1743; 1744; 1745; 1746; 1747; 1748; 1749; 1750; 1751; 1752; 1753; 1754; 1755; 1756; 1757; 1758; 1759; 1760; 1761; 1762; 1763 …
- Buildings and structures: Art; Archaeology; Architecture; Literature; Music; Philosophy; Science; +...

The year 1753 in architecture involved some significant events.

== Buildings and structures ==
=== Buildings ===
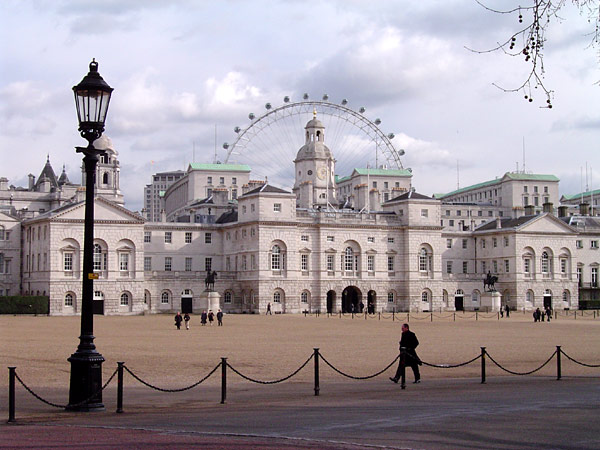
Horse Guards, London

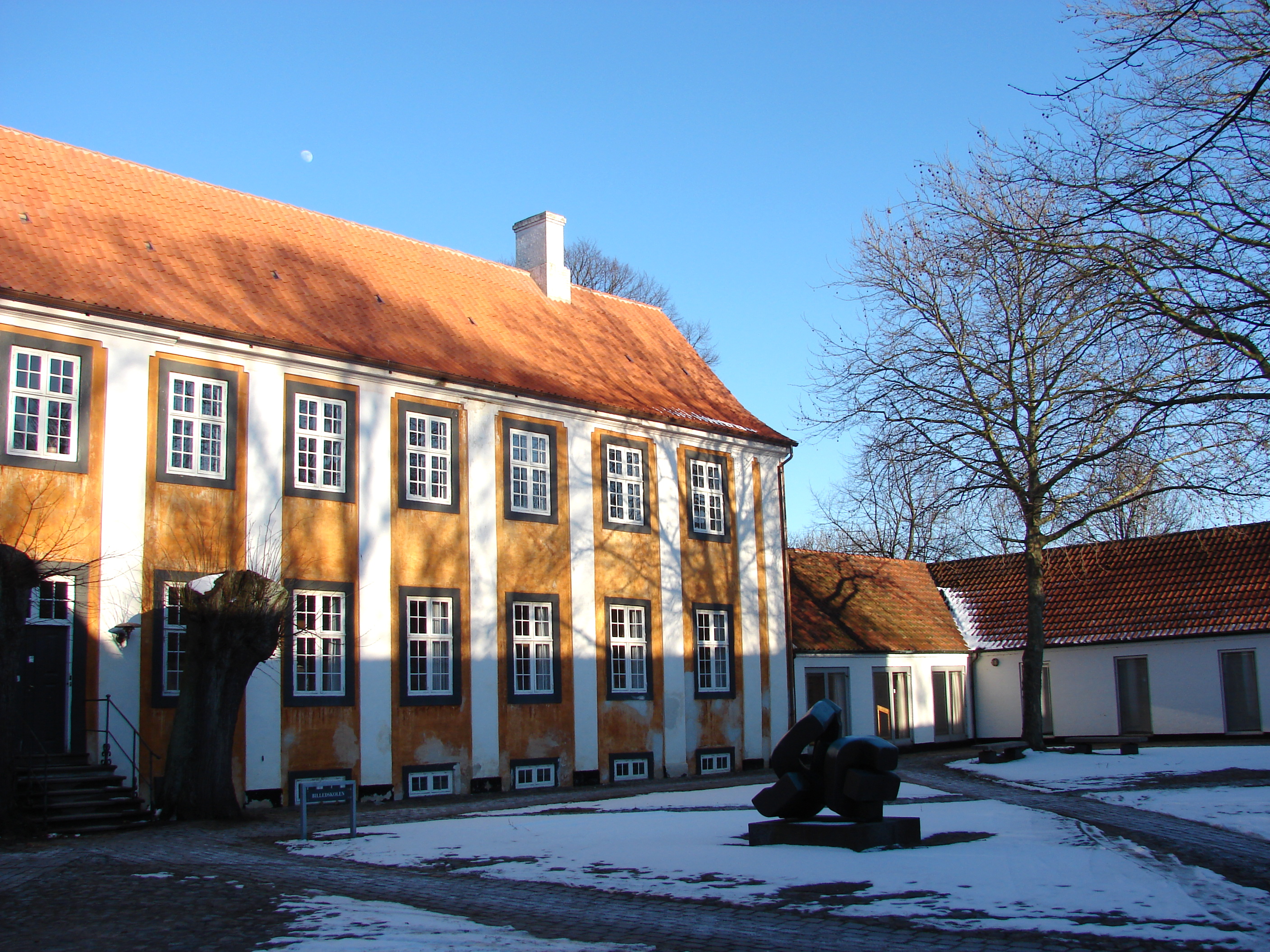
Kastrupgård in Copenhagen, Denmark

- Horse Guards in London, designed by William Kent and John Vardy, is completed.
- State House in Philadelphia, Pennsylvania, designed by Edmund Woolley and Andrew Hamilton, is completed.
- New Branicki Palace, Warsaw, designed by Johann Sigmund Deybel, is completed.
- First stage of Horace Walpole's Gothic Revival 'castle' at Strawberry Hill House near London is completed.
- Kastrupgård in Copenhagen, designed by Jacob Fortling for himself, is completed.
- Carlyle House, Alexandria, Virginia, is completed.
- Cuvilliés Theatre in the Munich Residenz, Bavaria, designed by François de Cuvilliés, is opened.
- Schlosstheater Schwetzingen in Schwetzingen Palace, Baden-Württemberg, designed by Nicolas de Pigage, is opened.
- Confidencen theatre in Ulriksdal Palace, Sweden, with interior completed by Carl Fredrik Adelcrantz, is opened.
- Teatro Carignano in Turin, designed by Benedetto Alfieri, is opened.
- Church of Santa Caterina (Livorno), designed by Giovanni Del Fantasia, is opened.
- New church of San Geremia in Venice, designed by Carlo Corbellini, is built.
- Sunehri Masjid, Lahore ('Golden Mosque'), designed by Nawab Syed Bhikari Khan, is built.
- Outer Pagoda of Monk Wansong in Beijing is built.
- Barakoni church in Georgia is commissioned from Avtandil Shulavreli.

== Births ==
- January 6 – Samuel Pepys Cockerell, English architect (died 1827)
- September 10 – John Soane, English architect (died 1837)
- Henry A. Baker, Irish architect (died 1836)
- Laurynas Gucevičius, Lithuanian architect (died 1798)

== Deaths ==
- February 9 – Carl Hårleman, Swedish architect (born 1700)
- August 19 – Balthasar Neumann, German baroque architect (born 1687)
- December 15 – Richard Boyle, 3rd Earl of Burlington, English Palladian architect and politician (born 1694)
