= 1756 in architecture =

List of years in architecture	(table)
- … 1746; 1747; 1748; 1749; 1750; 1751; 1752; 1753; 1754; 1755; 1756; 1757; 1758; 1759; 1760; 1761; 1762; 1763; 1764; 1765; 1766 …
- Buildings and structures: Art; Archaeology; Architecture; Literature; Music; Philosophy; Science; +...

The year 1756 in architecture involved some significant events.

== Events ==
- Greek Revival architecture appears in the window design for Nuneham House in Oxfordshire, England, by Stiff Leadbetter.
- John Smeaton produces the first high-quality cement using hydraulic lime since Roman times for construction of the third Eddystone Lighthouse (completed 1759).

== Buildings and structures ==
=== Buildings ===
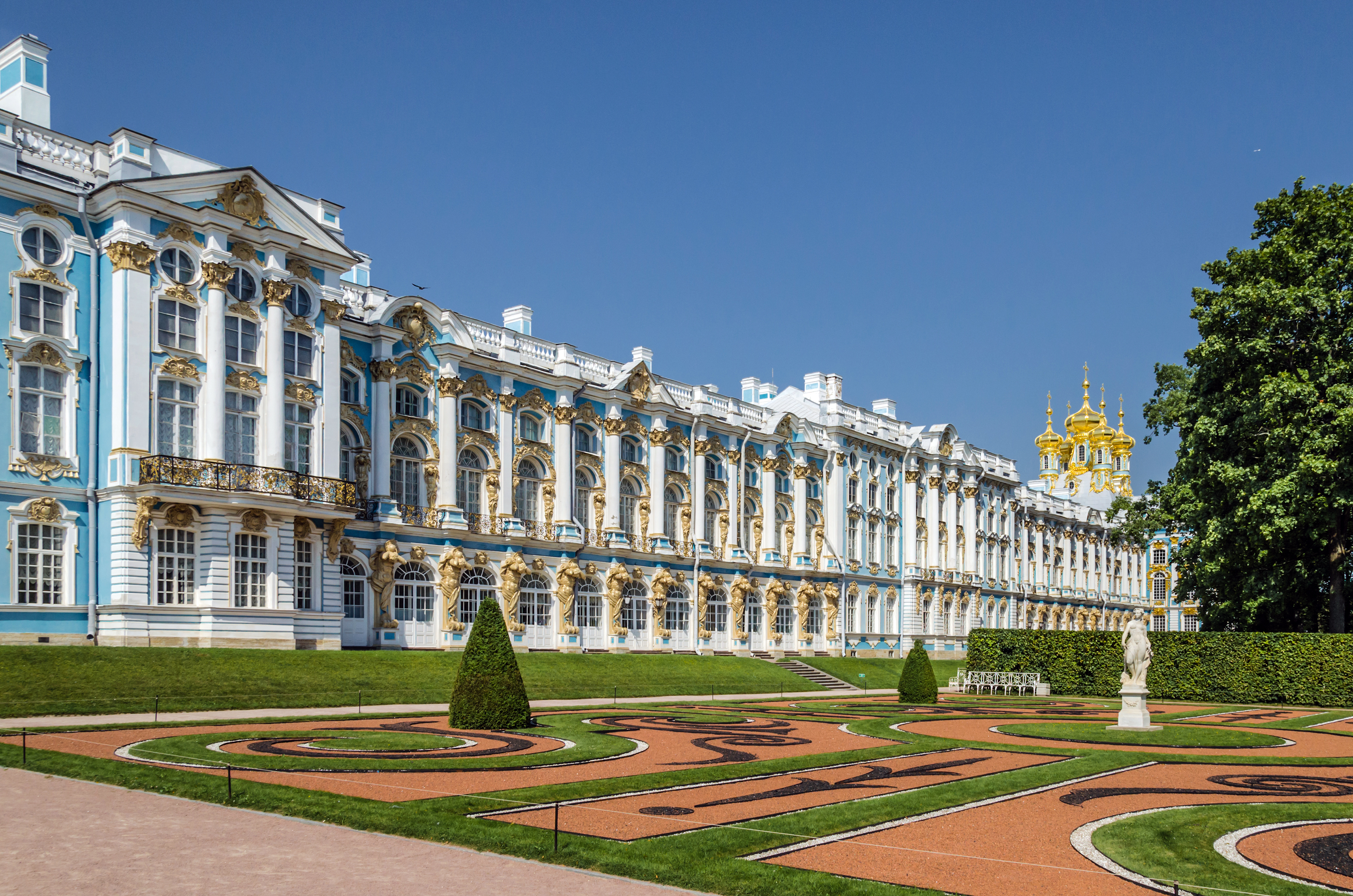
Catherine Palace, Tsarskoye Selo, Russia

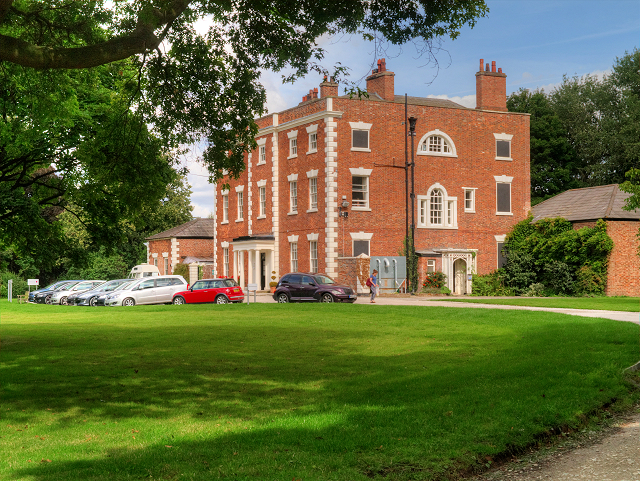
Trafford Hall

- Replacement Catherine Palace, Tsarskoye Selo in Russia, designed by Francesco Bartolomeo Rastrelli, is completed.
- Klov Palace, Kiev in Russia, probably designed by Gottfried Schädel and Pyotr Neyelov, is completed.
- Replacement Basilica of the Birth of the Virgin Mary, Chełm in Poland, designed by Paweł Fontana, is completed.
- Reconstruction of Abbot's Palace (Oliwa) in Gdańsk, Poland, is completed.
- Newbridge, now Old Bridge, Pontypridd in Wales, designed by William Edwards, is completed.
- St Andrew's in the Square, Glasgow, Scotland, designed by Allan Dreghorn, is completed.
- Octagon Chapel, Norwich in England, designed by Thomas Ivory, is completed.
- Original Whitefield's Tabernacle, Tottenham Court Road in London is built.
- Trafford Hall in England is built.
- Wrotham Park, Hertfordshire in England, designed by Isaac Ware, is completed.
- Shaw Mansion (New London, Connecticut) is built.
- The President's House (Princeton), New Jersey, is built.
- First Presbyterian Church (Newburyport, Massachusetts) is built.
- Alloways Creek Friends Meetinghouse, Hancock's Bridge, New Jersey, is built.
- Saint Gevorg of Mughni Church, Tbilisi in Armenia is completely rebuilt.
- St John the Evangelist Church, Shobdon, Herefordshire, England, is completely rebuilt with a "Strawberry Hill Gothic" interior. Elements of the previous building are incorporated in folly arches nearby.

== Publications ==
- Isaac Ware publishes A Complete Body of Architecture in London.

== Births ==
- February 29 – C. F. Hansen, Danish architect (d. 1845)
- Chrystian Piotr Aigner, Polish architect (d. 1841)
- Giovanni Antonio Antolini, Italian architect (d. 1841)
- 1756 or 1758 – Francesco Piranesi, Italian-born architectural engraver and architect (d. 1810)

== Deaths ==
- July 1 – Giambattista Nolli, Italian architect and surveyor (b. 1701)
