= John Booth (architect) =

British architect and surveyor

John Booth (1759–1843) was a British architect and surveyor.

In 1817 he remodelled St George's Church, Queen Square, London and in 1821 rebuilt the south aisle of St Helen's church, Ore, Sussex (now in ruins).

He was a member of the Drapers' Company and its master in 1821.
