= 1845 in architecture =

The year 1845 in architecture involved some significant architectural events and new buildings.

== Events ==
- Two influential clergy houses for the Church of England are designed: the Rectory at Rampisham, Dorset, designed by Augustus Pugin (along with restoration of the church; completed 1847) and the Vicarage at Coalpit Heath in south Gloucestershire, designed by William Butterfield (along with his first new Anglican church, St Saviour's, consecrated October 9).
- Robert William Billings begins publication of The Baronial and Ecclesiastical Antiquities of Scotland.

== Buildings and structures ==
=== Buildings completed ===
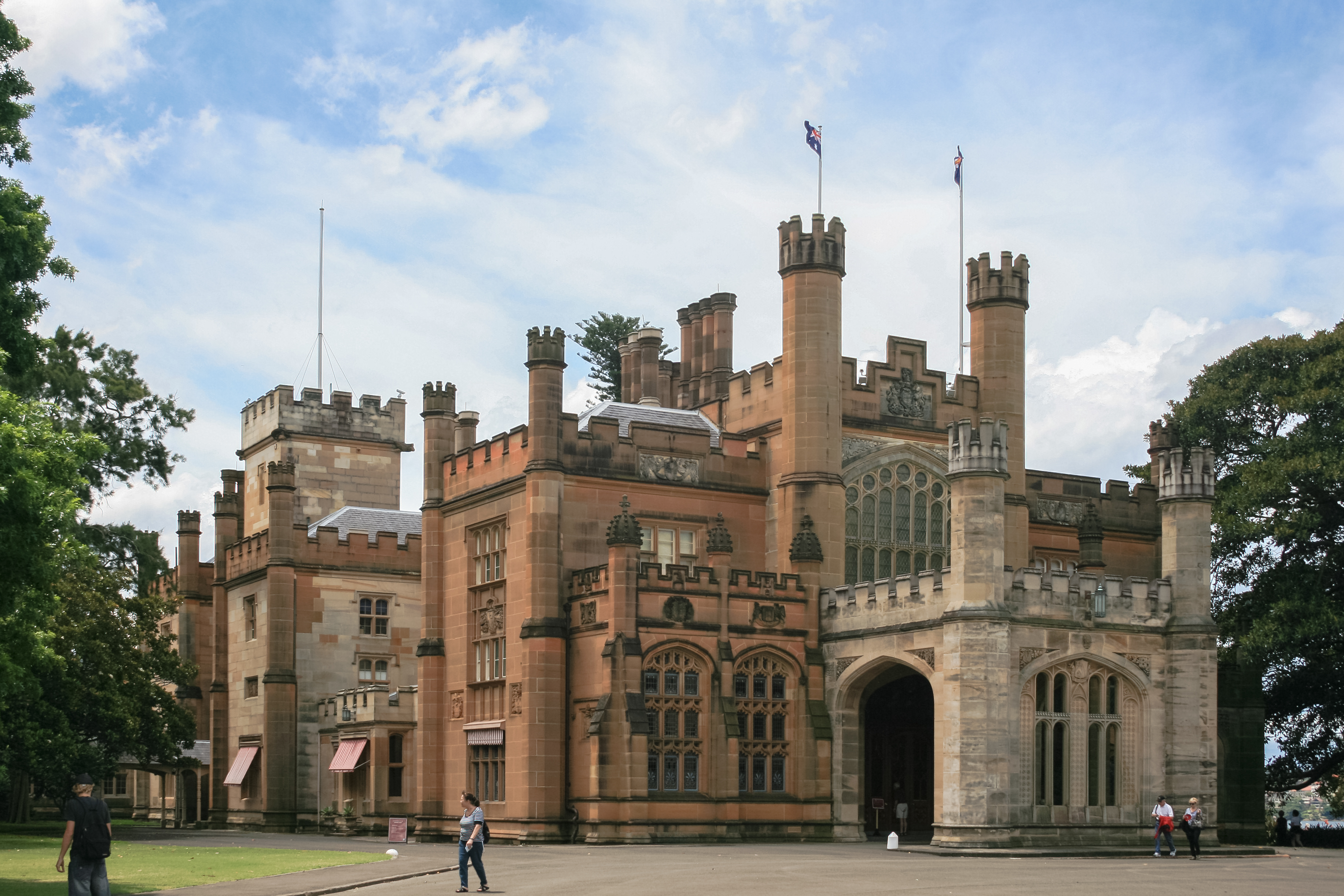
Government House, Sydney

- Trafalgar Square in London, designed by Charles Barry and John Nash is completed.
- Government House, Sydney in Australia, designed by Edward Blore, is completed and first occupied.
- Tolbooth Kirk, Edinburgh, designed by James Gillespie Graham and Augustus Pugin, is completed as a church and General Assembly hall (Victoria Hall) for the Church of Scotland.
- New St Mary and St Nicholas parish church in Wilton, Wiltshire, England, designed by Thomas Henry Wyatt and David Brandon, is completed at about this date.
- Praha Masarykovo nádraží, the first railway station in Prague, designed by Antonín Jüngling, is completed.
- Cambridge railway station in England is opened.
- Oundle and Wansford railway stations on Northampton and Peterborough Railway in England, designed by John William Livock, opened.

== Awards ==
- Grand Prix de Rome, architecture: Félix Thomas.

== Births ==
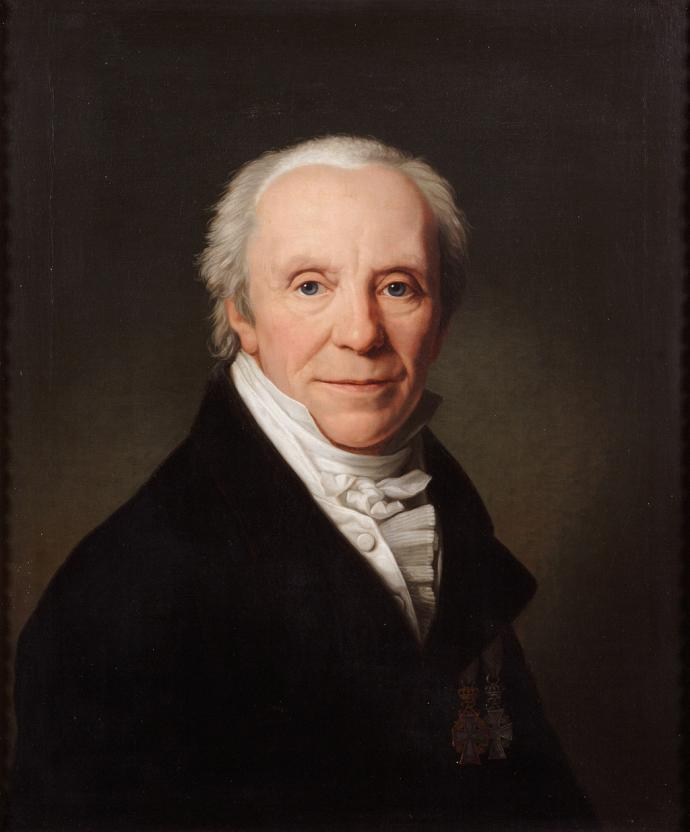
Christian Frederik Hansen

- August 17 – Gyula Pártos, Hungarian architect (died 1916)
- October 9 – Ferdinand Arnodin, French bridge engineer (died 1924)
- December 12 – Bruce Price, American architect (died 1903)

== Deaths ==
- July 10 – Christian Frederik Hansen, Danish architect ("Denmark’s Palladio") (born 1756)
- July 12 – Friedrich Ludwig Persius, Prussian architect (born 1803)
- Fryderyk Bauman, Polish architect, sculptor and decorator (born 1765/70)
