= 1670s in architecture =

== Buildings and structures ==
=== Buildings ===
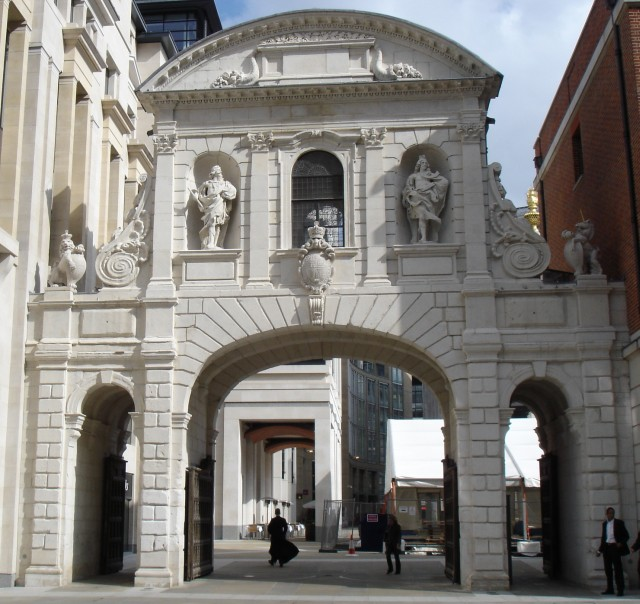
Temple Bar, London in 2004 location

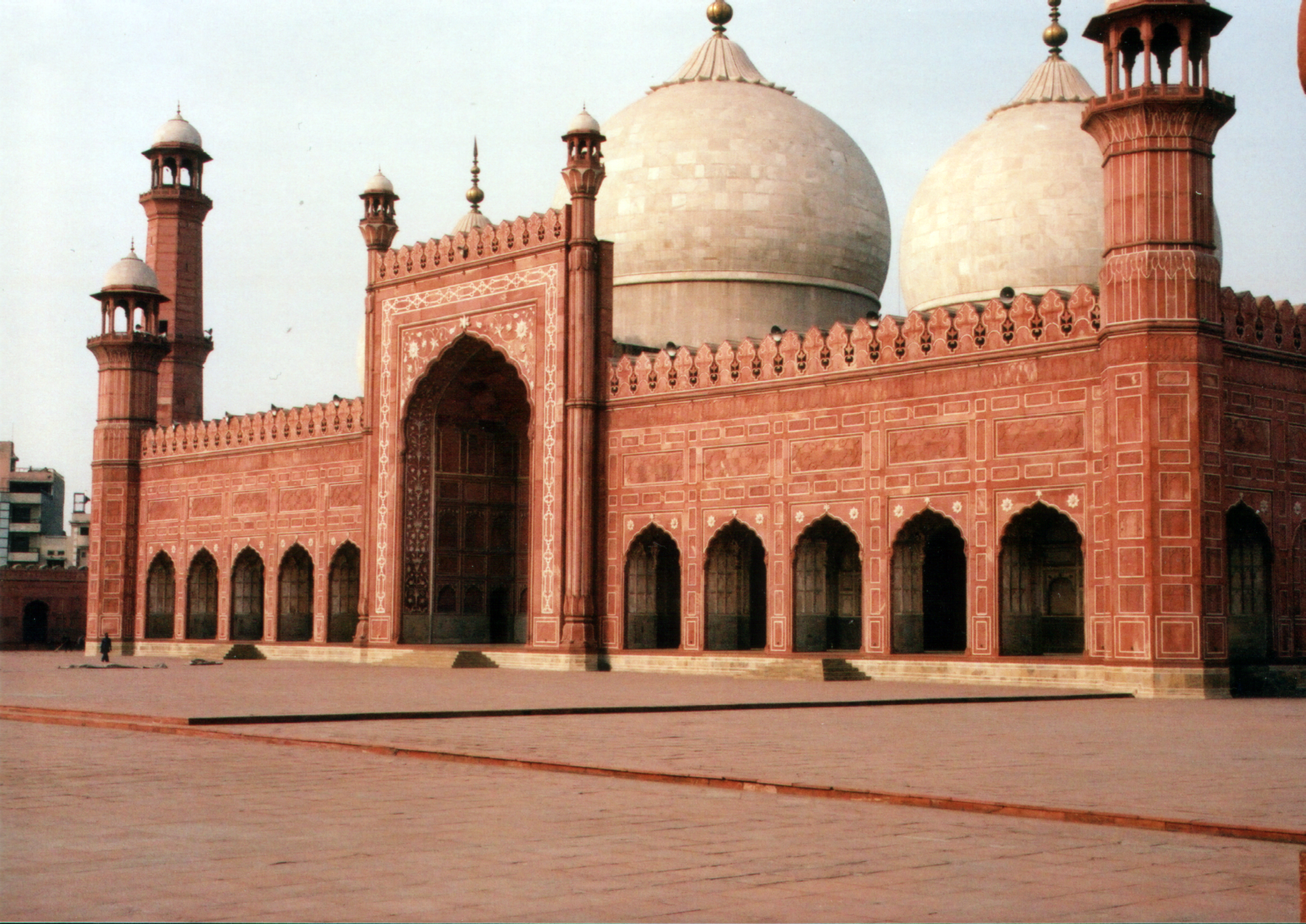
Badshahi Masjid, Lahore

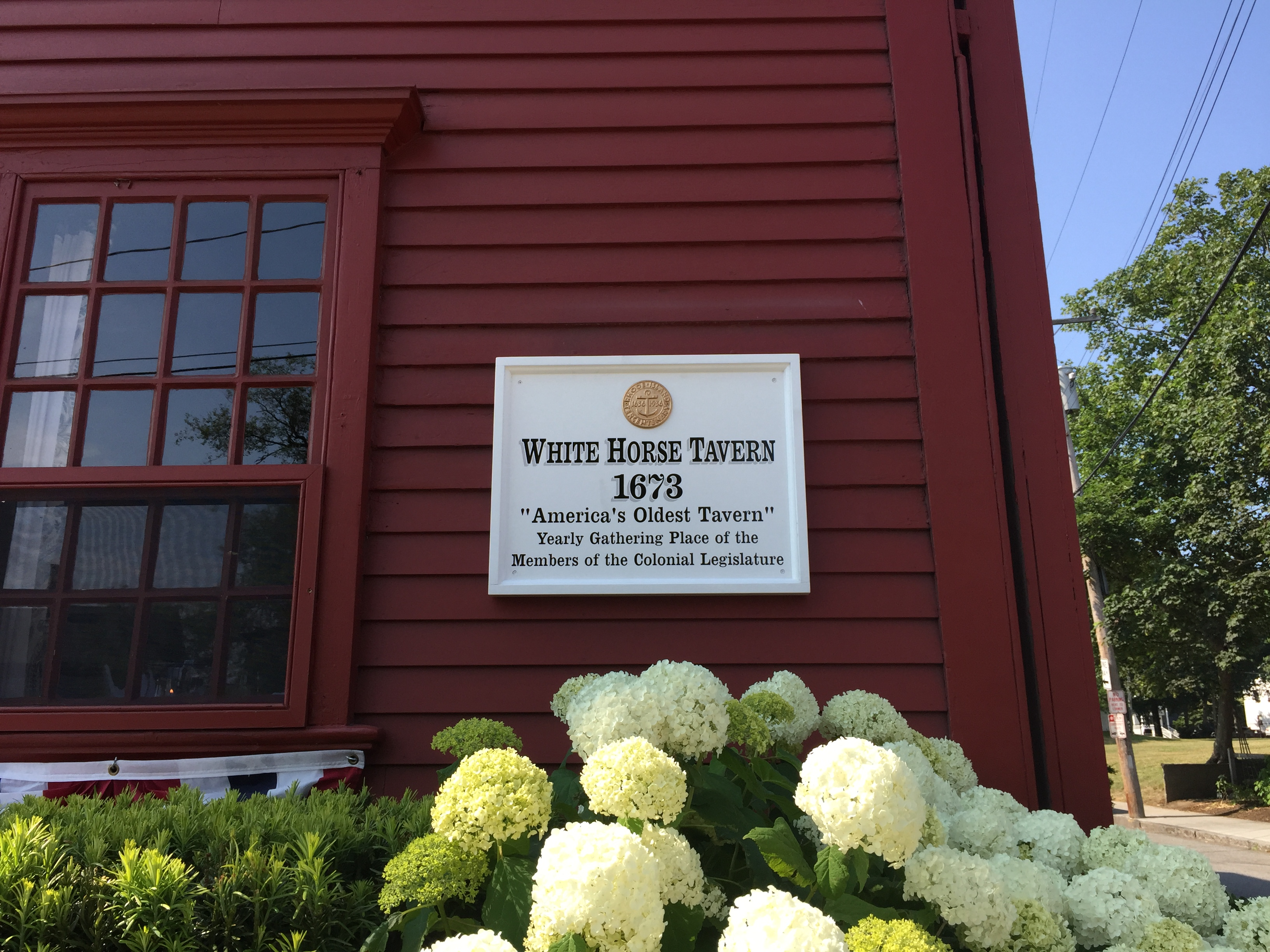
The White Horse Tavern in Newport, Rhode Island

- 1670
  - Báo Quốc Pagoda, Huế, Vietnam, is built.
  - Saint George Palace, Rennes, France, has its foundation stones laid.
- 1671 – Weston Park, Shropshire, England, is built for Elizabeth Wilbraham.
- 1672
  - Buildings by Christopher Wren in England:
    - Temple Bar, London rebuilt.
    - Williamson Building at The Queen's College, Oxford, completed.
  - Church of Monastery of Serra do Pilar in Gaia, Portugal, consecrated.
  - Construction of Castillo de San Marcos at St. Augustine, Florida, designed by Ignacio Daza, begins.
- 1673
  - April – Badshahi Masjid in Lahore, Punjab, built for Aurangzeb, is completed.
  - October 3 – Kintai Bridge in Iwakuni, Suō Province (modern-day Yamaguchi Prefecture), Japan, is officially completed.
  - The White Horse Tavern in Newport, Rhode Island (estimated completion date)
  - St Mary-le-Bow church in London, designed by Christopher Wren, rebuilding completed.
  - Monastery of San Francisco, Lima, Peru, is consecrated (completed 1774).
  - Berkeley House, London, designed by Hugh May and begun in 1665, is completed.
- 1675
  - June – Work on the new St Paul's Cathedral in London, designed by Christopher Wren, begins.
  - June 11 – Theatine Church, Munich, consecrated in form as left by Agostino Barelli.
  - August 2 – Portuguese Synagogue (Amsterdam), designed by Elias Bouwman and begun in 1671, is completed.
  - Bethlem Royal Hospital in London, designed by Robert Hooke.
  - Briggflatts Meeting House near Sedbergh in north-west England built.
- 1676
  - The Royal Greenwich Observatory in London, designed by Christopher Wren is completed.
  - Wren Library, Cambridge, the library of Trinity College, England, is designed by Christopher Wren (completed 1695).
  - Main courtyards of Les Invalides in Paris, designed by Libéral Bruant, are completed.
  - Skokloster Castle in Sweden, designed by Caspar Vogel with Jean de la Vallée and Nicodemus Tessin the Elder, is completed.
  - St. Peter and St. Paul's Church, Vilnius is completed.

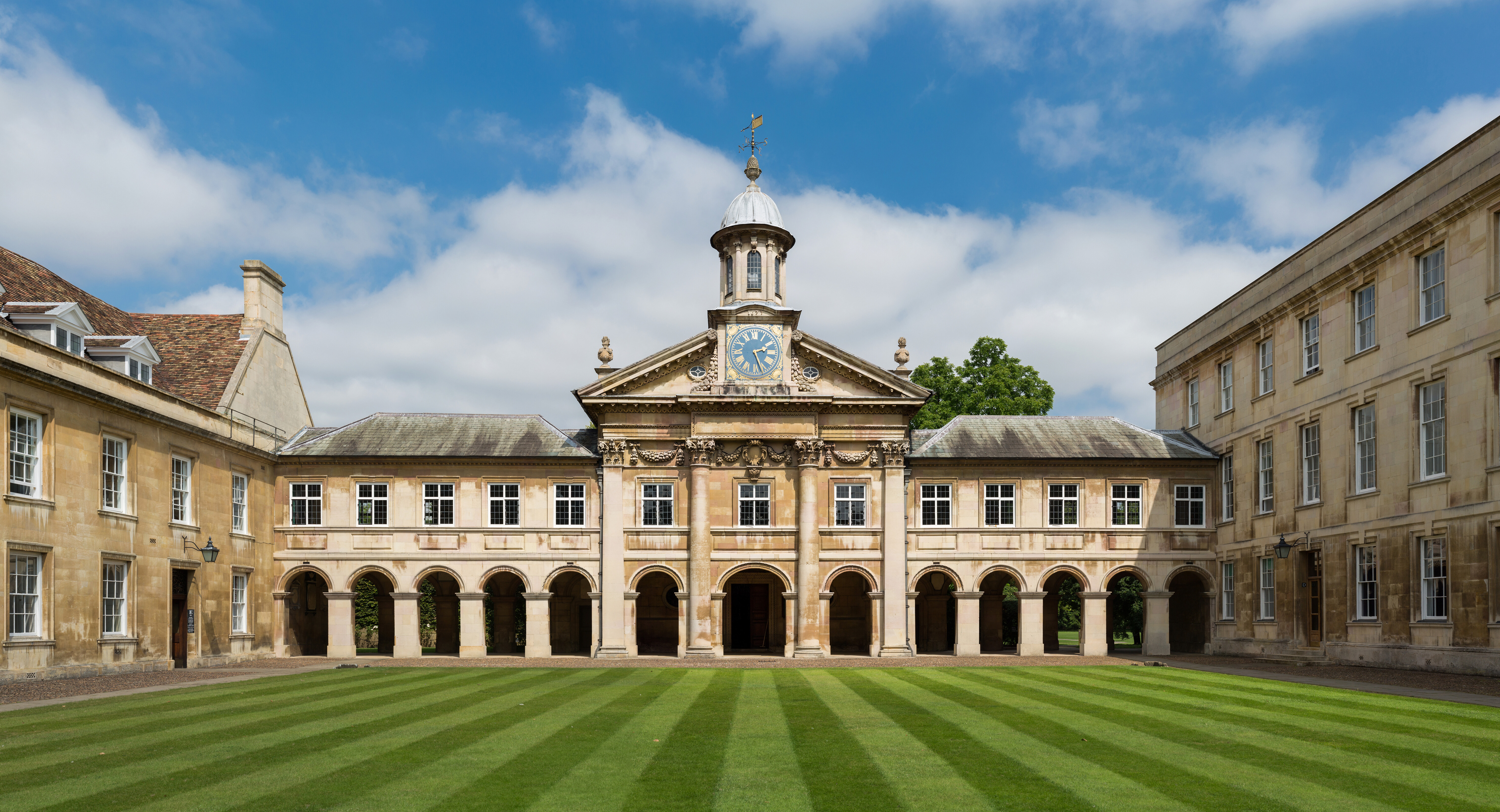
The Emmanuel College, Cambridge

- 1677
  - The Monument to the Great Fire of London, designed by Christopher Wren and Robert Hooke is completed.
  - Chapel of Emmanuel College, Cambridge, designed by Christopher Wren.
  - Remodelling of Cornbury House in Oxfordshire, England, designed by Hugh May and begun about 1663, is completed.
- 1679
  - Chapel (Église Saint-Louis des Invalides) at Les Invalides, Paris, is completed to the design of Libéral Bruant.
  - Černín Palace in Prague, designed by Francesco Caratti, is completed.
  - Montagu House, Bloomsbury, London, designed by Robert Hooke, is completed.

== Events ==
- 1671: December 30 – The Académie royale d'architecture is founded by Louis XIV of France in Paris, the world's first school of architecture.

== Births ==
- 1672 – Francis Smith of Warwick, English architect (died 1738)
- 1673 – Johann Friedrich Ludwig, German-born architect working in Portugal (died 1752)
- c.1673 – John James, English architect (died 1746)
- 1676: June 15 – Colen Campbell, Scottish-born Georgian architect (died 1729)
- 1678: March 7 – Filippo Juvarra, Sicilian-born architect (died 1736)
- 1679 – Francesco Zerafa, Maltese architect (died 1758)

== Deaths ==
- 1670: October 11 – Louis Le Vau French classical architect (born 1612)
- 1672: October 24 – John Webb, English architect (born 1611)
- 1677: June 26 – Francesco Buonamici, Italian Baroque architect, painter and engraver (born 1596)

== See also ==
- Architecture timeline
