= 1690s in architecture =

== Buildings and structures ==
=== Buildings ===
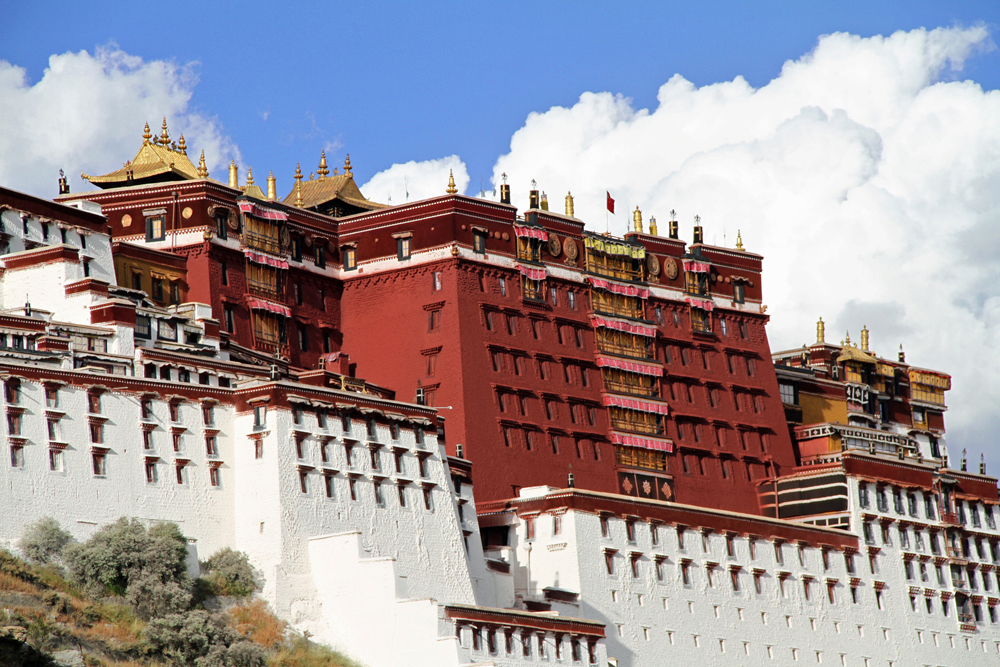
Potala Palace

- 1690
  - The Sindone Chapel in Turin, Piedmont, designed by Guarino Guarini is completed.
  - The Barrage Vauban, designed by Vauban and built by Jacques Tarade in Strasbourg, France, is completed
- 1690–1700 – Two Baroque palaces in Vilnius, Sapieha Palace and Slushko Palace, designed by Pietro Perti, are erected.
- 1689–1691 – Swallowfield Park, near Reading, Berkshire, England, designed by William Talman, is built.
- 1691–1697 – Branicki Palace, Białystok, Poland, designed by Tylman van Gameren, is built.
- 1692
  - St. Kazimierz Church, Warsaw, Poland, designed by Tylman van Gameren, is completed.
  - Theatine Church, Munich, Bavaria, designed by Agostino Barelli in 1662, is substantially completed to the design of Enrico Zuccalli.
- 1694
  - The Potala Palace in Lhasa is completed by construction of the Potrang Marpo ('Red Palace').
  - The Radziejowski Palace in Nieborów, Poland, designed by Tylman van Gameren, is built.
  - The Chapel of the Holy Shroud in Turin, begun by Amedeo di Castellamonte in 1668, is completed to the design of Guarino Guarini.
- 1695 – Wren Library, the library of Trinity College, Cambridge, England, designed by Christopher Wren, is completed.

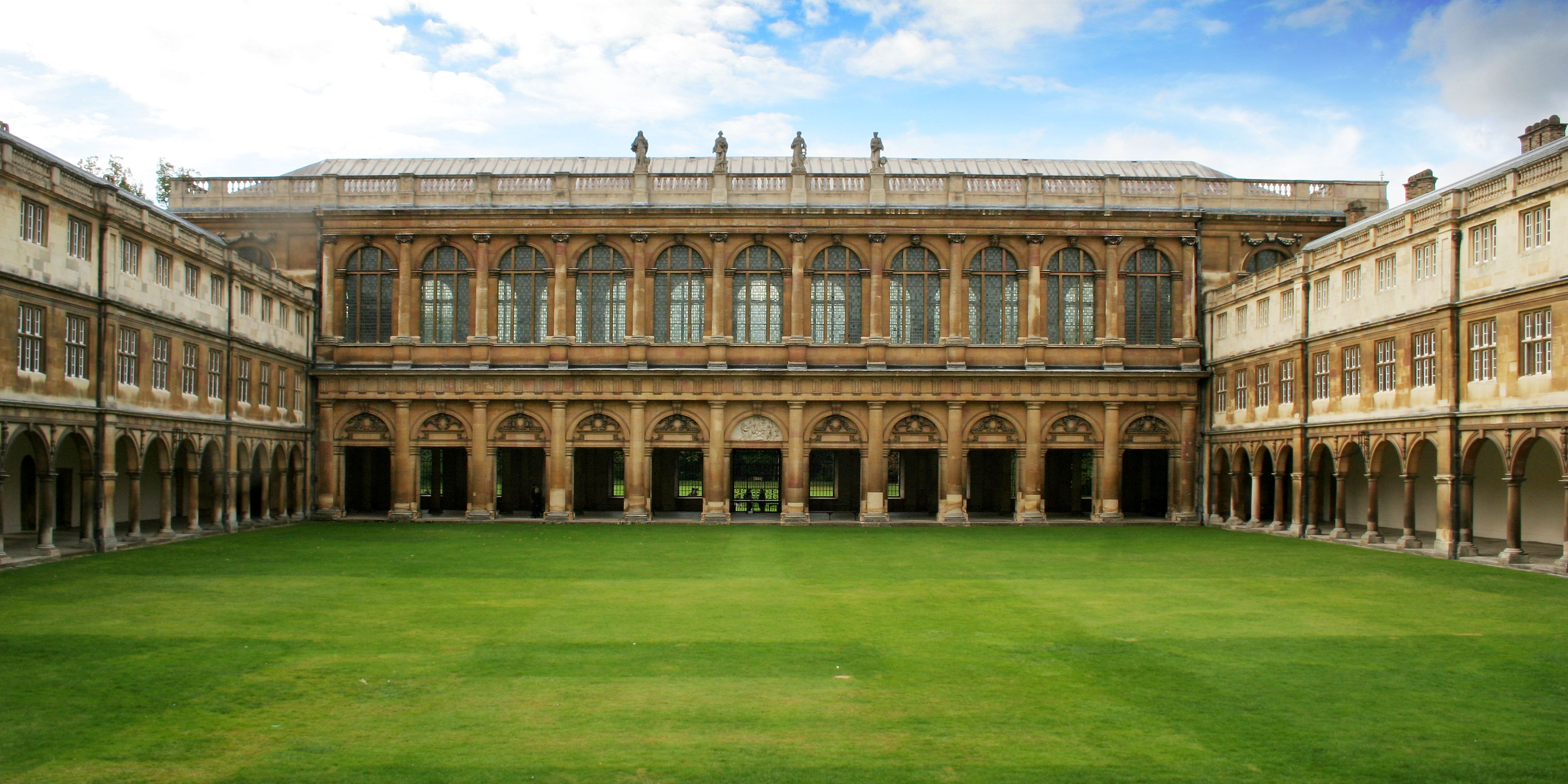
Wren Library

- 1695–1699 – Craigiehall, near Edinburgh, Scotland, designed by Sir William Bruce.
- 1696
  - Main façades of Chatsworth House completed to designs of William Talman in a pioneering English Baroque style.
  - Library of The Queen's College, Oxford, designed locally, is completed.
  - Construction of Schönbrunn Palace in Vienna to the design of Johann Bernhard Fischer von Erlach begins.
- 1697 – Trinity Cathedral in Solikamsk, Russia (begun 1683), is completed.
- 1698 – Fortified town of Neuf-Brisach in Alsace, designed by Sébastien Le Prestre de Vauban, is begun.
- 1699 – Castle Howard in Yorkshire, England (completed 1712), designed by Sir John Vanbrugh and Nicholas Hawksmoor, is begun.

== Events ==
- 1696 – Window tax is introduced in England.
- 1697: May 7 – The 13th century royal Tre Kronor ("Three Crowns") castle in Stockholm burns to the ground; the plan for the replacement Stockholm Palace by Nicodemus Tessin the Younger is presented a few weeks later.

== Births ==
- 1690 – Richard Cassels, German-born architect working in Ireland (died 1751)
- 1691
  - June 17 – Giovanni Paolo Panini, Italian painter and architect (died 1765)
  - September 1 – James Burrough, English academic, amateur architect and antiquary (died 1764)
- 1692 – Pietro Antonio Trezzini, Swiss architect working in Saint Petersburg (died after 1760)
- 1693
  - January 29 – Henry, Lord Herbert, later Earl of Pembroke, English courtier and architect (died 1749)
  - September 13 – Joseph Emanuel Fischer von Erlach, Viennese architect (died 1742)
- 1694
  - April 25 – Richard Boyle, 3rd Earl of Burlington, English aristocrat and architect (died 1753)
  - September 26 – Martin Schmid, Swiss Jesuit missionary, musician and architect working in Bolivia (died 1772)
- 1695
  - April 19 – Roger Morris, English architect (died 1749)
  - October 23 – François de Cuvilliés, Walloon-born dwarf and architect working in Bavaria (died 1768)
- 1696: September 14 (bapt.) – Batty Langley, English garden architect (died 1751)
- 1698: October 23 – Ange-Jacques Gabriel, French architect (died 1782)
- 1699
  - Edward Lovett Pearce, Irish architect (died 1733)
  - (probable date) – Matthew Brettingham, English architect (died 1769)

== Deaths ==
- 1691: February 8 – Carlo Rainaldi, Roman architect (born 1611)
