= 1767 in architecture =

The year 1767 in architecture involved some significant events.

== Events ==
- January 9 – William Tryon, governor of the Royal Colony of North Carolina, signs a contract with architect John Hawks to build Tryon Palace, a lavish Georgian style governor's mansion on the New Bern waterfront.

== Buildings and structures ==
=== Buildings ===
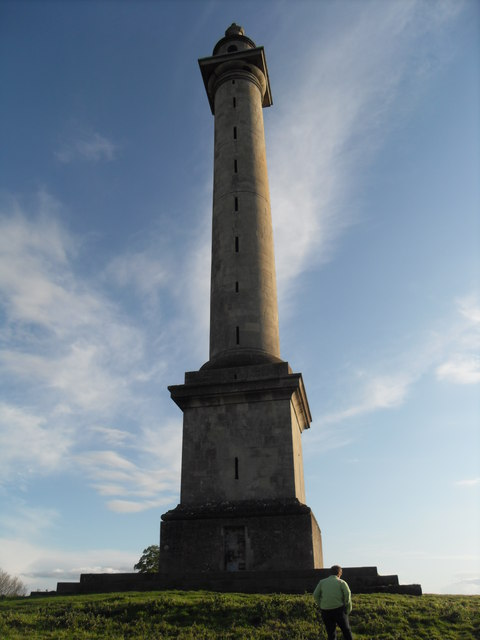
Burton Pynsent Monument

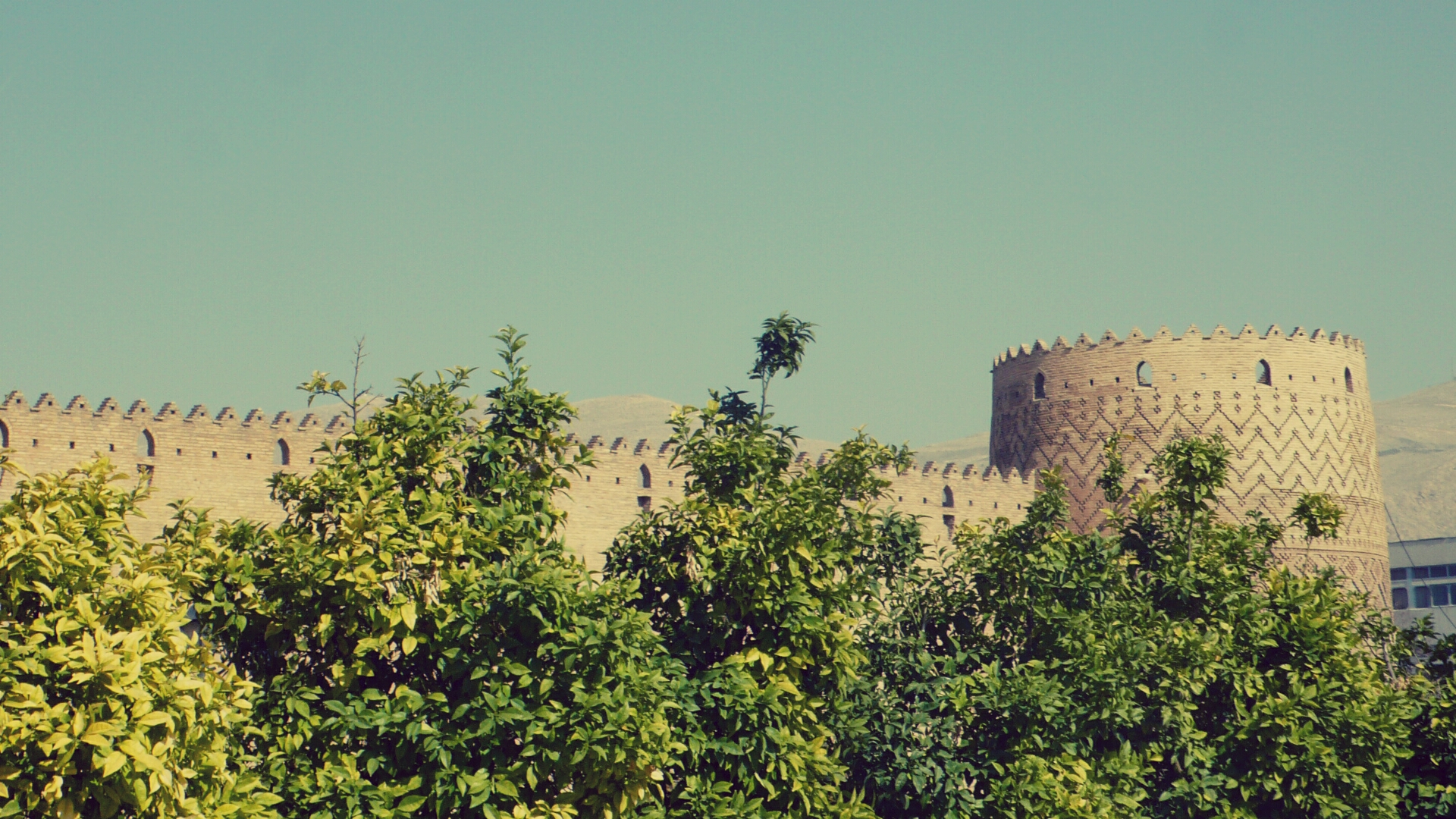
Arg of Karim Khan, Shiraz

- In Bath, Somerset, England, the Octagon Chapel, designed by Timothy Lightholder or Lightoler, is completed and Royal Crescent, designed by John Wood, the Younger, is begun.
- St Helen's House, Derby, England, designed by Joseph Pickford, is completed.
- Walton Hall, West Yorkshire, England, is built.
- Auchincruive house in Scotland, based on designs by Robert Adam, is completed.
- Cliveden (Benjamin Chew House) in Germantown, Philadelphia, designed by William Peters, is completed.
- Elmwood (Cambridge, Massachusetts) is built about this date.
- In New Haven, Connecticut, the John Pierpont house (the modern-day Yale University Visitor Center) is built.
- Church of St Catherine in the Yakimanka District of central Moscow, designed by Karl Blank, is completed.
- Holy Mother of God Cathedral, Vagharshapat, Armenia, is built.
- Mühlstraße Evangelical church in Jeckenbach in the Rhineland, perhaps designed by Philipp Heinrich Hellermann, is built.
- The circular Kilarrow Parish Church in Bowmore on Islay in Scotland is built.
- In Kórnik, Poland, a wooden synagogue is built.
- Old Brick Church (New York City), designed by John McComb, Sr, is built.
- The first church in Salem, New York, is built.
- The Birchwood Inn in Lenox, Massachusetts (The Berkshires), is built.
- Arg of Karim Khan citadel in Shiraz, Persia, is completed.
- Refsnes Gods pleasure pavilion on the Norwegian island of Jeløy is built.
- Burton Pynsent Monument in Somerset, England, designed by Capability Brown, is erected.
- Temple of Harmony garden folly at Halswell House, Somerset, England, designed by Thomas Prowse, is built.

== Births ==
- April 6 – Alexandre-Vincent Pineux Duval, French dramatist, sailor, architect, actor and theatre manager (died 1842)
- Richard Morrison, Irish architect (died 1849?)
- William Saunders, American builder (died 1861)

== Deaths ==
- December 9 – Benedetto Alfieri, Italian architect (born 1699)
- Georges Vallon, French architect (born 1688)
