= 1680s in architecture =

== Buildings and structures ==
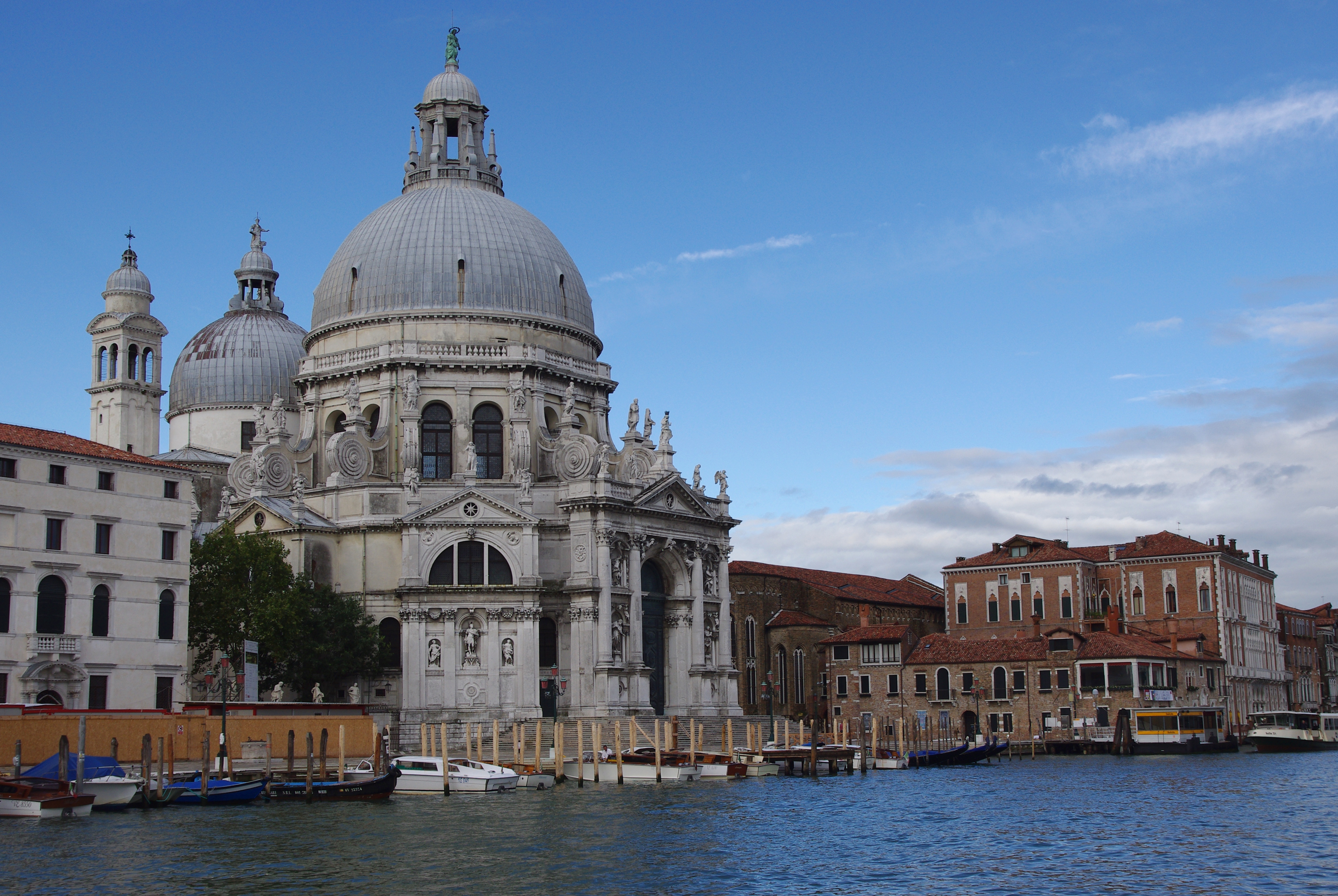
Santa Maria della Salute

- 1680
  - St Clement Danes, London, designed by Christopher Wren, is completed.
  - Church of San Lorenzo, Turin, designed by Guarino Guarini, is substantially completed.
  - Star Building at Windsor Castle and Cassiobury House in England, designed by Hugh May, are completed; and his work on St George's Hall, Windsor Castle, is beginning.
- 1681
  - Basilica of Santa Maria della Salute in Venice, designed by Baldassare Longhena in 1631, is dedicated.
  - Sobieski Royal Chapel in Gdańsk, designed by Tylman van Gameren, is completed.
  - Old Ship Church Puritan meeting house in Hingham, Massachusetts, which will become the oldest church building in continuous ecclesiastical use in the United States, is erected.
  - Basilica of Our Lady of the Pillar in Zaragoza, Aragon, is begun to the design of Francisco Herrera the Younger (completed 1754).
- 1682
  - Abingdon County Hall in Oxfordshire, England, designed by Christopher Kempster, is completed.
  - Tom Tower at Christ Church, Oxford, England, designed by Christopher Wren, is completed.
  - College of Matrons in Salisbury, England, probably designed by Christopher Wren, is built.
  - Khan al-Wazir in Aleppo is completed.

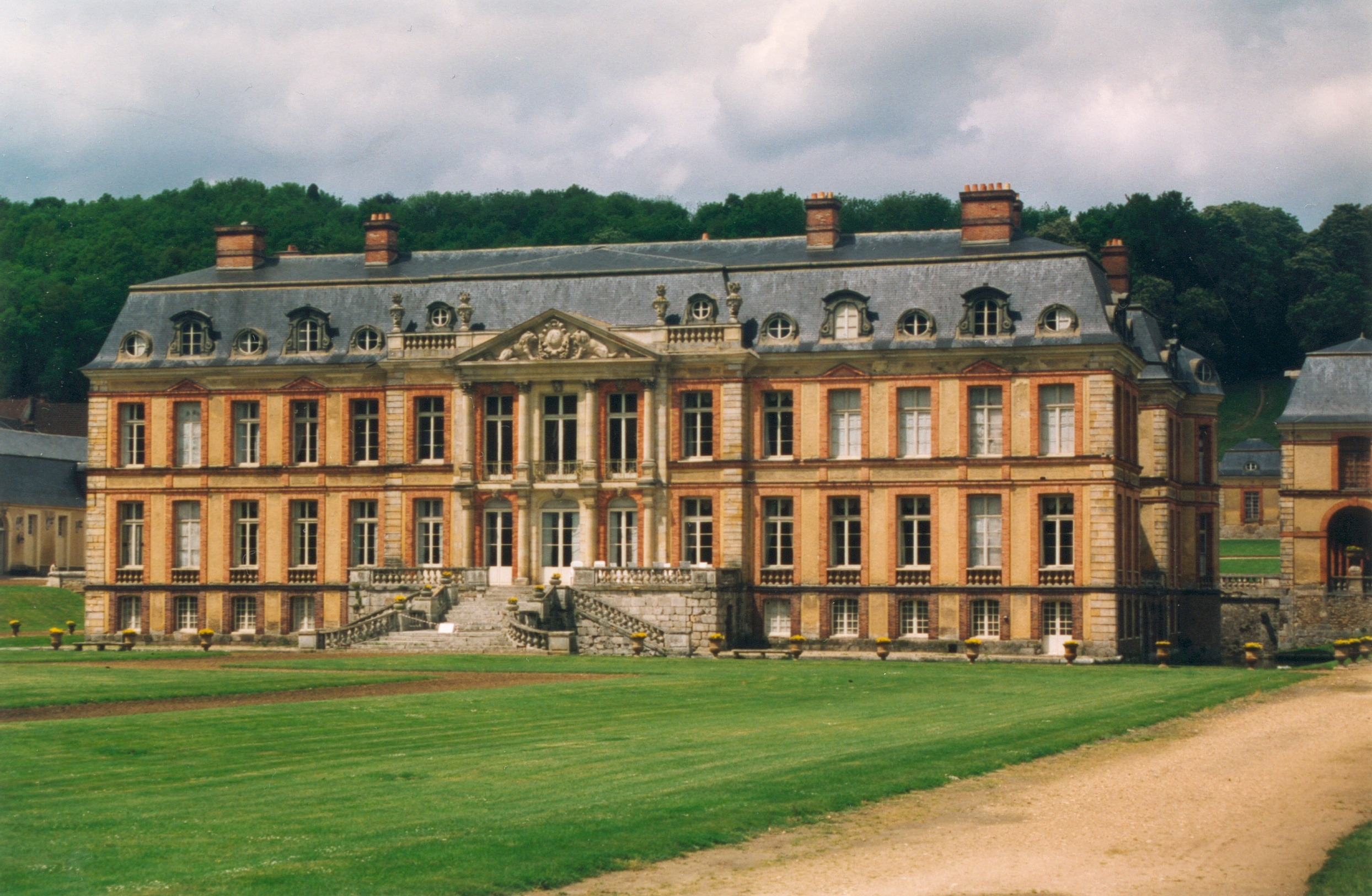
Château de Dampierre in France

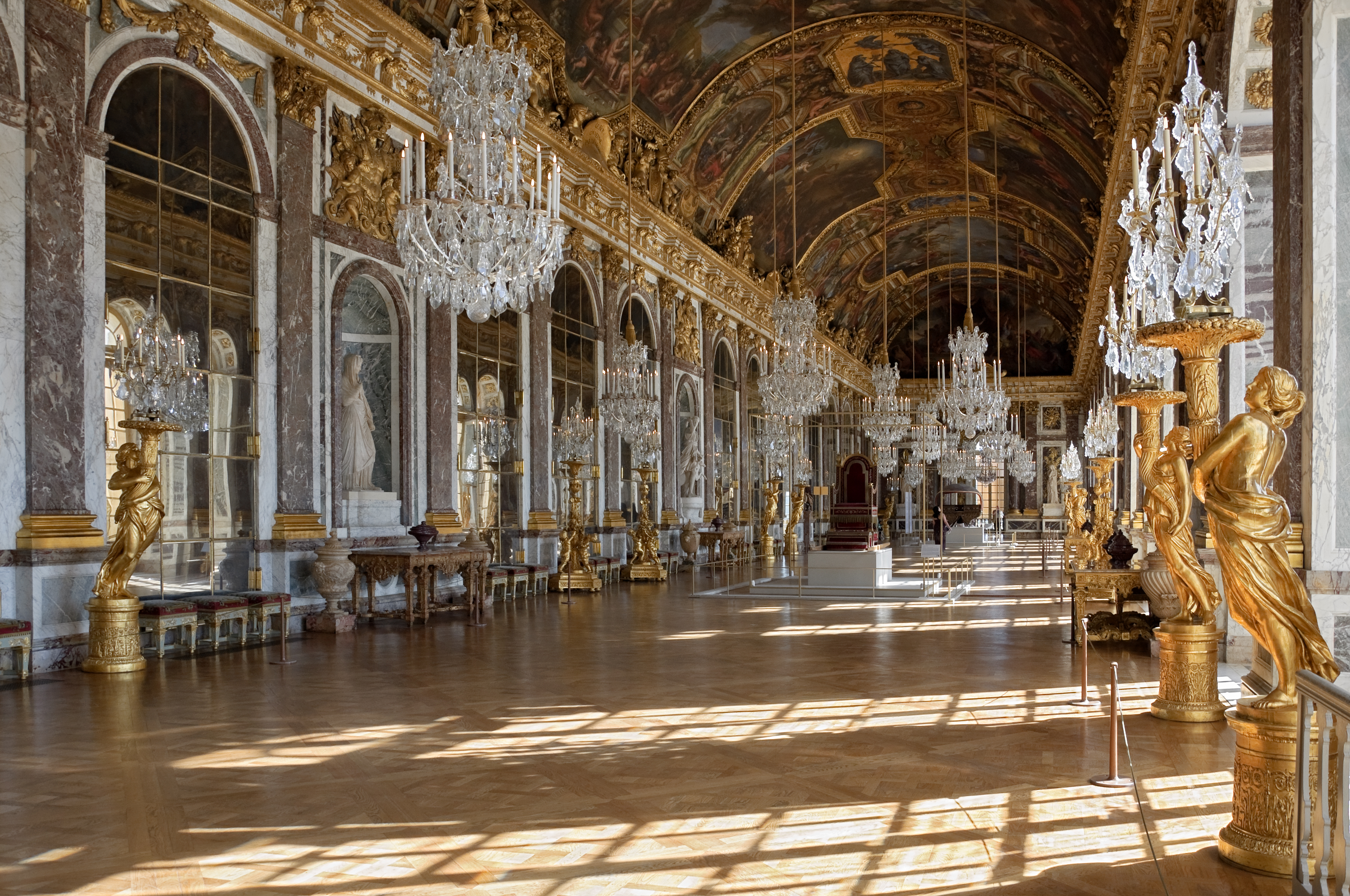
Hall of Mirrors, Palace of Versailles

- 1683
  - The Old Ashmolean Museum in Oxford, probably designed by the mason Thomas Wood, is opened, the first purpose-built university museum (the modern day Museum of the History of Science).
  - Ramsbury Manor in Wiltshire, England, designed by Robert Hooke, is completed (his Ragley Hall in Warwickshire is nearing completion at this time).
  - Château de Dampierre in France, designed by Jules Hardouin Mansart, is completed.
  - Église Saint-Thomas-d'Aquin (Paris), designed by Pierre Bullet, is consecrated.
- 1684
  - The Royal Hospital Kilmainham in Dublin, Ireland, designed by William Robinson, is completed as a home for retired soldiers.
  - The Hall of Mirrors at the Palace of Versailles in France, designed by Jules Hardouin Mansart, is completed.
  - The Château de Marly in the Marly-le-Roi commune is completed for Louis XIV.
  - The Canal de l'Eure with its notable aqueduct, designed by the military engineer Lieutenant Général Vauban to serve Versailles for Louis XIV, is begun; work is abandoned about 1690.
  - Middle Temple gateway, Fleet Street, London, designed by Roger North, is completed.
  - The original Kaohsiung Confucius Temple is built.
- 1685
  - Ishak Pasha Palace in eastern Anatolia is begun.
- 1686
  - The Het Loo Palace at Apeldoorn in the Netherlands, designed by Jacob Roman and Johan van Swieten and begun in 1684, is completed; the garden is designed by Claude Desgotz.
  - Kinross House in Scotland, designed by Sir William Bruce for himself, is begun.

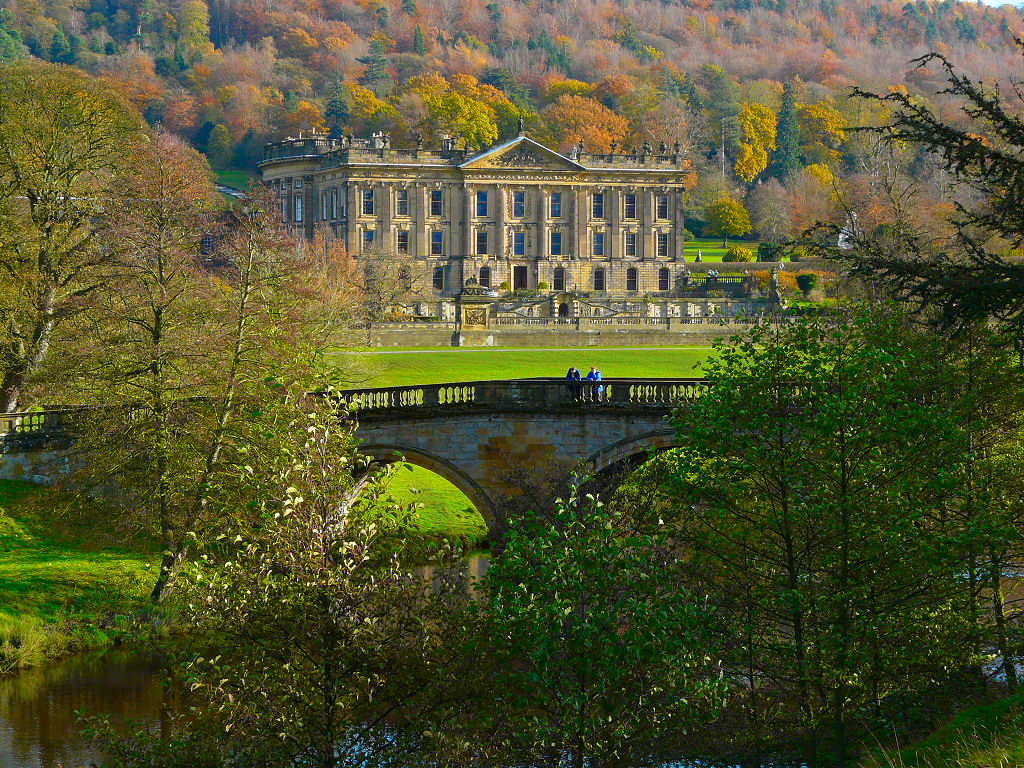
Chatsworth House in Derbyshire, England

- 1687
  - Neanderkirche in Düsseldorf (begun 1683) is completed.
  - The rebuilding of Chatsworth House in Derbyshire, England, begins under William Talman.
  - The Parthenon in Athens is extensively damaged in the Morean War.
- 1688
  - Belton House in Lincolnshire, England, perhaps designed by William Winde, is completed.
  - Friends meeting house at Jordans, Buckinghamshire, England.
- 1689
  - Windsor Guildhall in Berkshire, England, designed by Sir Thomas Fitz (or Fiddes), is completed by Christopher Wren.
  - Swallowfield Park, near Reading, Berkshire, England, is designed by William Talman.
  - Bieliński Palace in Otwock Wielki, Poland, designed by Tylman van Gameren, is completed.
  - Lubomirski bathing pavilion at Łazienki Palace, Warsaw, Poland, designed by Tylman van Gameren, is completed.

== Events ==
- 1682: October 27 – The city of Philadelphia, Pennsylvania is founded by William Penn, laid out on a grid pattern.
- 1689: May – William Talman appointed Comptroller of the King's Works in England.

== Births ==
- 1682
  - William Benson, English amateur architect and politician (died 1754)
  - December 23 – James Gibbs, Scottish-born architect (died 1754)
- 1683 – Thomas Ripley, English architect (died 1758)
- c. 1685 – William Kent, English architect and designer (died 1745)
- 1686
  - September 29 – Cosmas Damian Asam, German Baroque architect and painter (died 1739)
  - Giacomo Leoni, Venetian-born architect (died 1746)
- 1687: January 27? – Balthasar Neumann, German architect (died 1753)
- 1689: October – William Adam, Scottish architect (died 1748)

== Deaths ==
- 1680
  - November 28
    - Gian Lorenzo Bernini, Italian sculptor and architect (born 1598)
    - Giovanni Francesco Grimaldi, Italian architect and painter (born 1606)
- 1682: February 18 – Baldassare Longhena, Venetian Baroque architect (born 1598)
- 1684
  - February 20 – Roger Pratt, English gentleman architect (born 1620)
  - February 21 – Hugh May, English architect (born 1620)
- 1688: October 9 – Claude Perrault, French architect (born 1613)
