= 1760 in architecture =

The year 1760 in architecture involved some significant events.

== Buildings and structures ==
=== Buildings ===
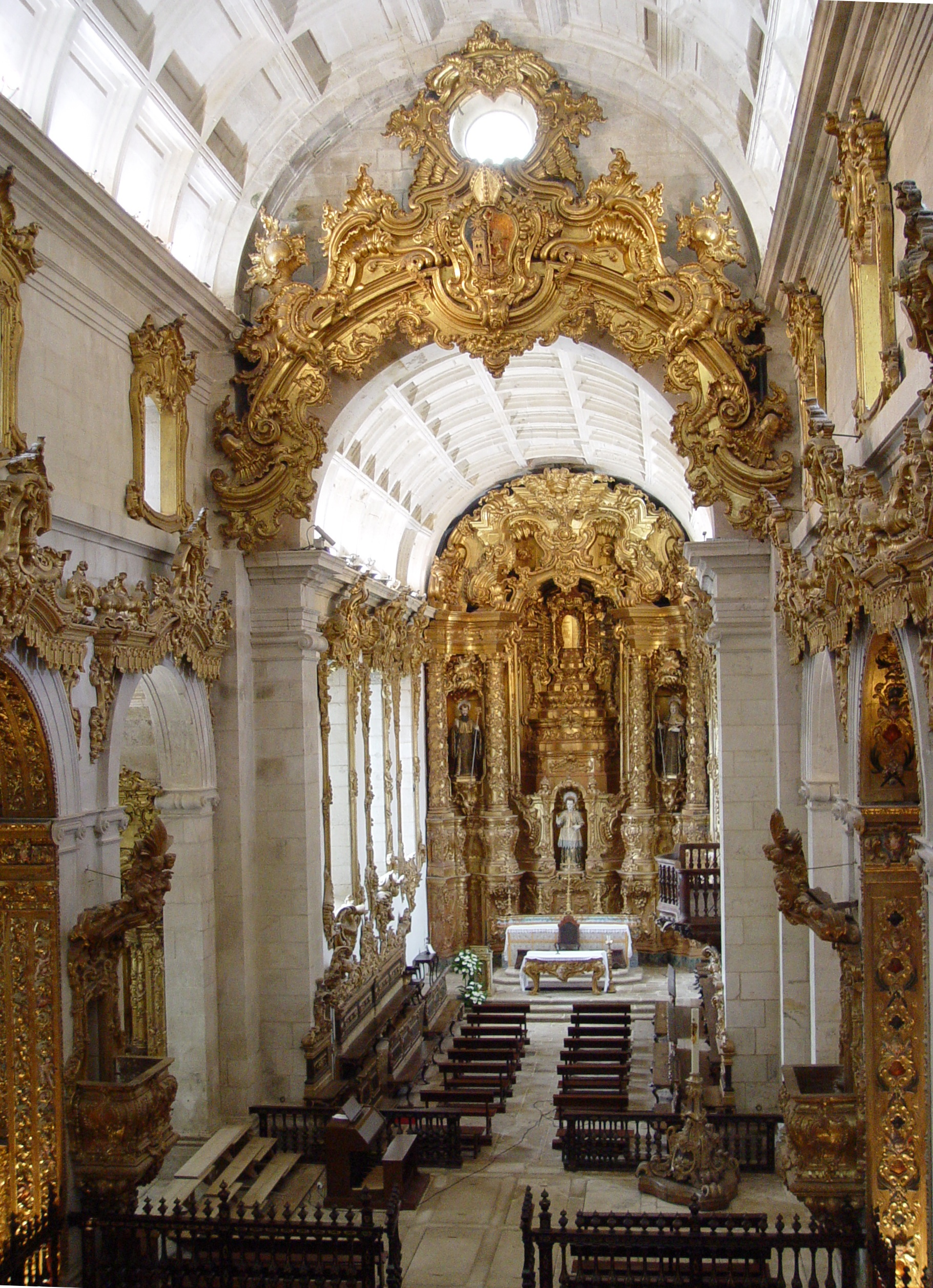
Monastery of São Martinho de Tibães

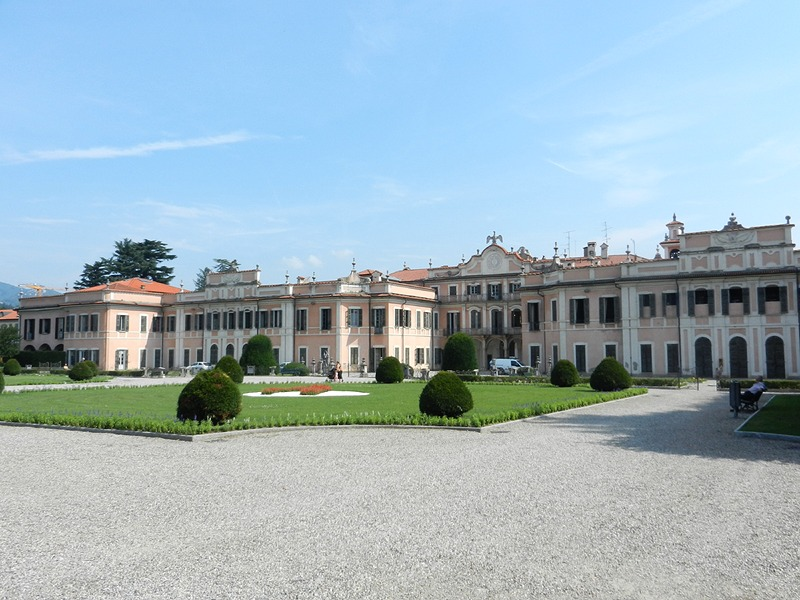
Palazzo Estense in Varese, Italy

- The Laleli Mosque ("Tulip Mosque") in Istanbul is begun (completed in 1763).
- St. George's Cathedral, Lviv, Ukraine, designed by Bernard Meretin, is completed.
- Servite Church, Vienna, designed by Martin Carlone, is consecrated.
- Santa Maria della Pietà, Venice, designed by Giorgio Massari, is completed.
- Church of the Holy Trinity, Fulnek, Moravia, designed by Nikolaus Thalherr, is completed.
- Østre Porsgrunn Church in Telemark, Norway, designed by Lauritz de Thurah and Andreas Pfützner and built by Joen Jacobsen, is consecrated.
- Holy Trinity Church, Warrington, England, is completed.
- Interior rococo church decoration of the Monastery of São Martinho de Tibães in northern Portugal, designed by André Soares, is completed.
- Reredos of Our Lady of Light in Christo Rey Church, Santa Fe, New Mexico, is erected.
- Reconstruction of St. Cyril's Monastery in Kyiv by Ivan Hryhorovych-Barskyi is completed.
- Castellania in Valletta, completed by Giuseppe Bonnici to a design by Francesco Zerafa, is opened.
- Edinburgh City Chambers, designed by John Adam as the Royal Exchange, is opened.
- Hagley Hall in Worcestershire, England, designed by Sanderson Miller, is completed.
- Brockdorff's Palace in Copenhagen is completed.
- Grassalkovich Palace in Bratislava is built.
- Palazzo Estense in Varese, Lombardy, designed by Giuseppe Bianchi, is completed.
- Selo Mansion in Ljubljana.
- New country house at Sølyst (Klampenborg) near Copenhagen is built.
- Arno's Court Triumphal Arch in Bristol, England, designed by James Bridges, is built.
- In Amalfi, at Duomo square, a Baroque fountain is built.
- In Cortona, Tuscany, La Mucchia casa vacanze, a typical Tuscan farmhouse, is built by Count Passerini of Cortona.
- Stockholm Palace in Stockholm, Sweden is completed.
- The Old Brick Market, a "handsome expression of civic and commercial life" designed by Peter Harrison, opens in Newport, Rhode Island

== Births ==
- September 30 – Michele Cachia, Maltese architect and military engineer (died 1839)
- date unknown
  - James Cavanah Murphy, Irish-born architect and antiquary (died 1814)
  - Willey Reveley, English architect (died 1799)

== Deaths ==
- November 20 – Giovanni Carlo Galli-Bibiena, Italian architect and designer (born 1717)
