= 1120s in architecture =

- 1110s
- 1120s in architecture
- 1130s

Architecture timeline

== Buildings and structures ==
- 1120
  - Autun Cathedral begun.
  - Pagoda of Tianning Temple (天宁寺塔) in Beijing, China completed.
- c. 1120 – Abbey Church of Saint Foy in Conques, France completed.
- 1121
  - Hoysaleswara Temple of Halebidu, India (Hoysala Empire) completed.
  - October 23 – Choir of Tewkesbury Abbey in England consecrated (begun in 1102).
- 1123
  - Sant Climent de Taüll, Catalonia consecrated.
  - 2nd reconstruction of Basilica di San Zeno in Verona, Italy, begins.
  - Construction of the Château de Falaise in Normandy begins.
- 1124 – Reconstruction of Santa Maria in Cosmedin, Rome, completed (begun in 1118).
- 1125 – Duladeo (Duladeva) temple is built in Khajuraho, Chandela kingdom.
- c. 1125–1130 – Round Church of the Holy Sepulchre, Cambridge, England, built.
- 1127 – Rochester Castle, England begun.
- 1128
  - Florence Baptistry, Tuscany completed.
  - Reconstruction of Angoulême Cathedral, France completed, largely as remaining in modern times.
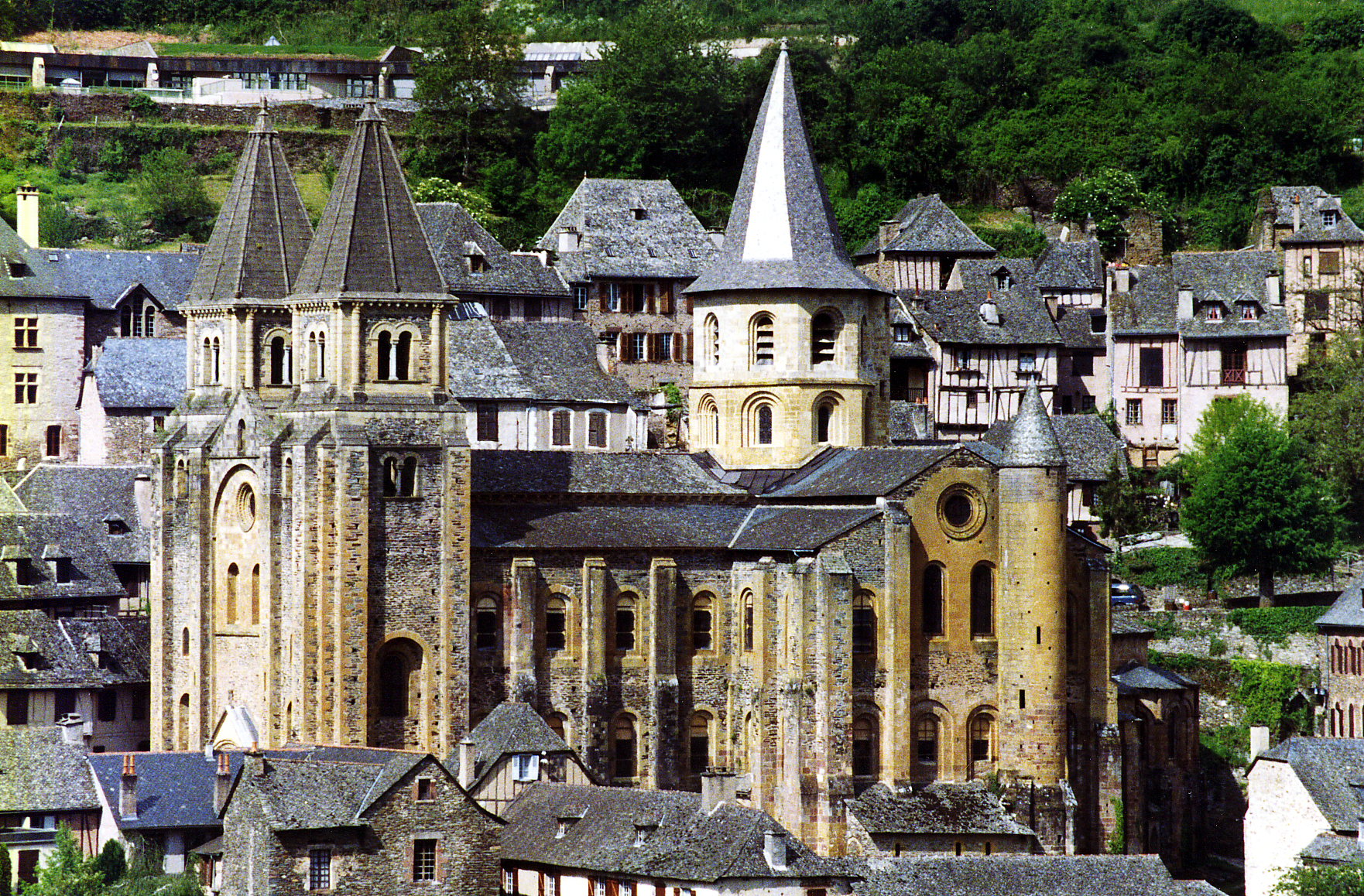
Sainte-Foy abbey-church in Conques (about 1120)

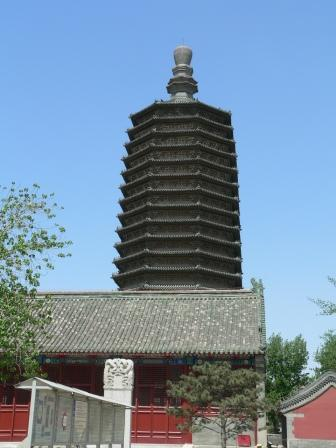
Pagoda of Tianning Temple (1120)

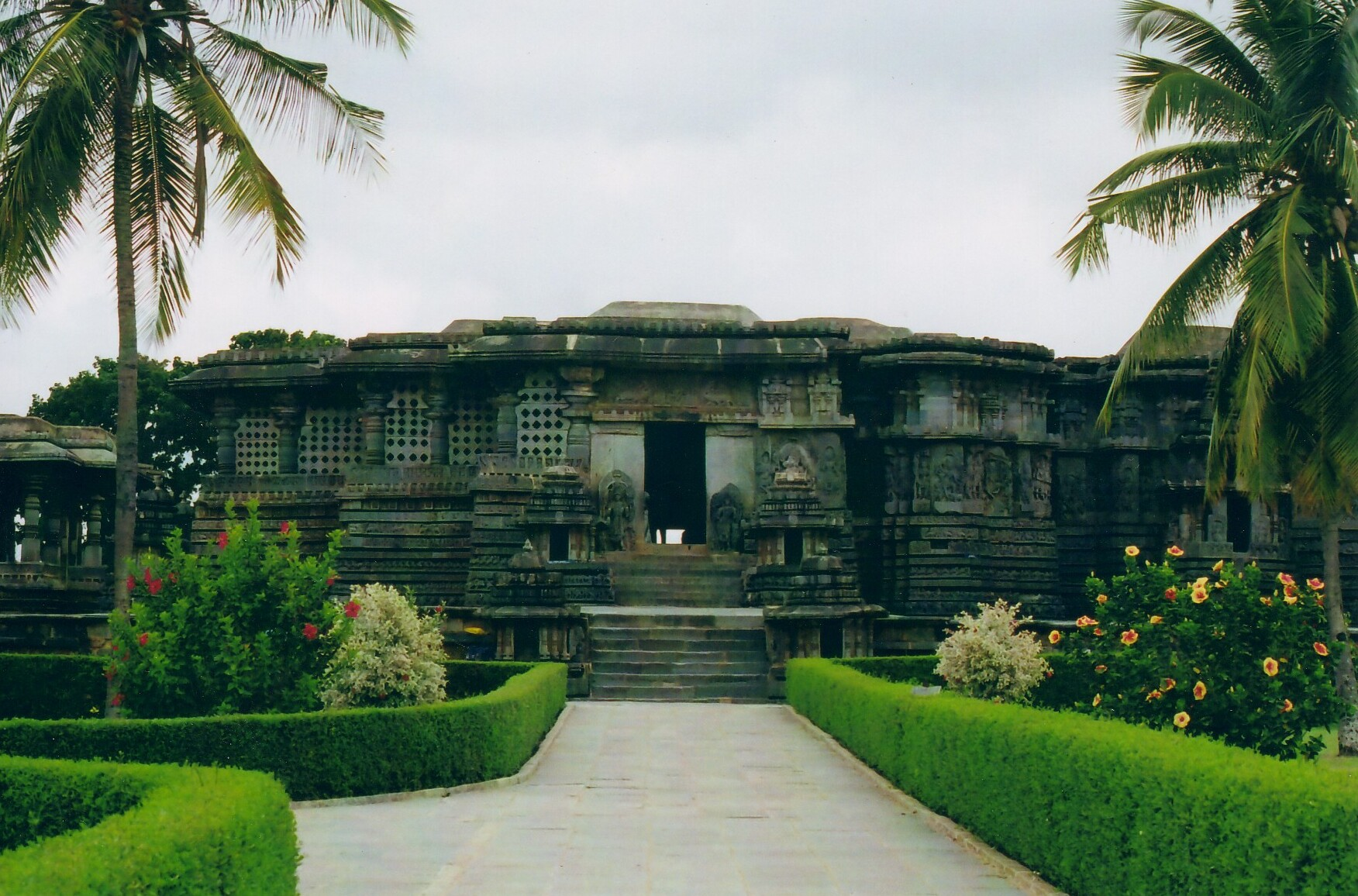
Hoysaleswara Temple (1121)

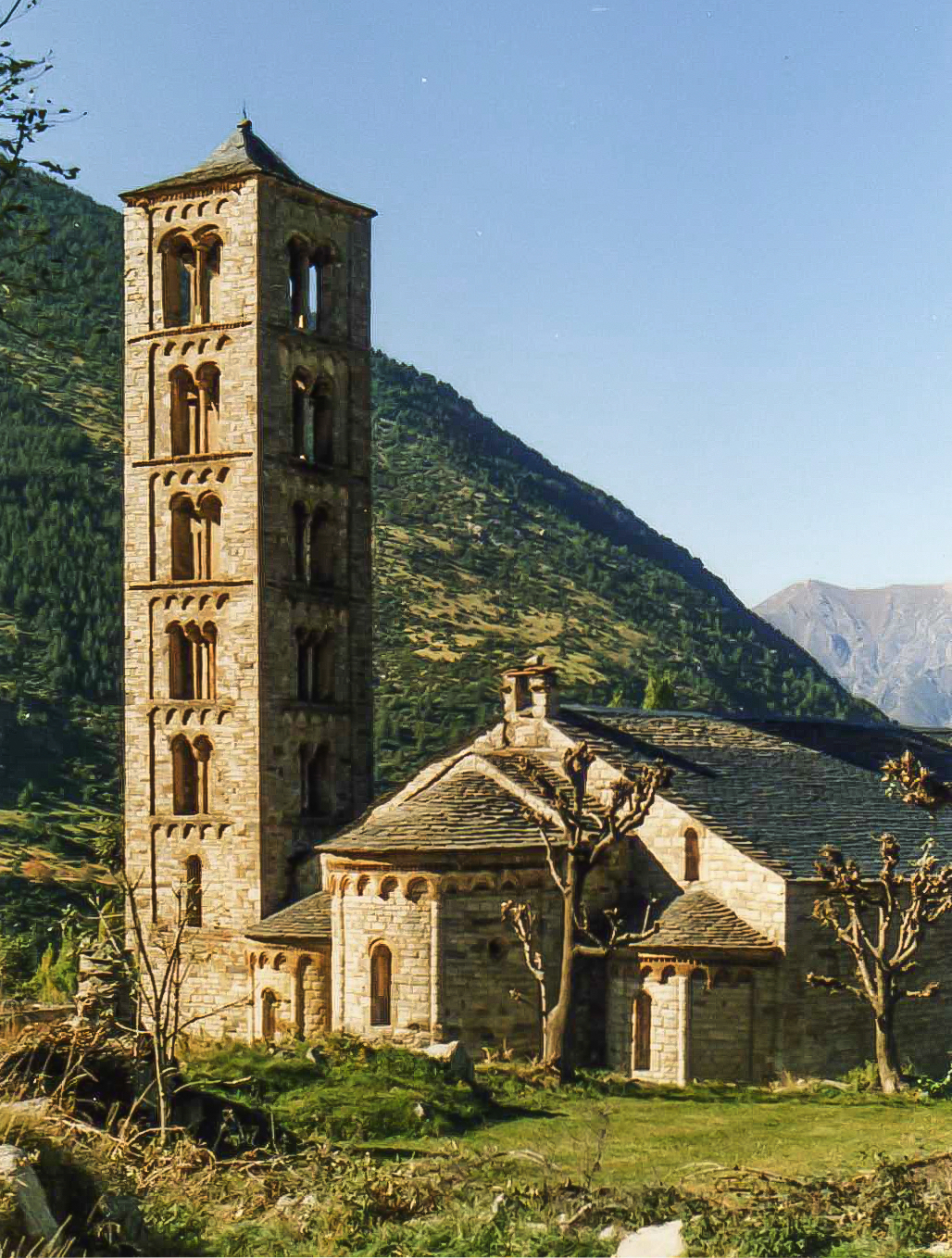
Sant Climent de Taüll (1123)

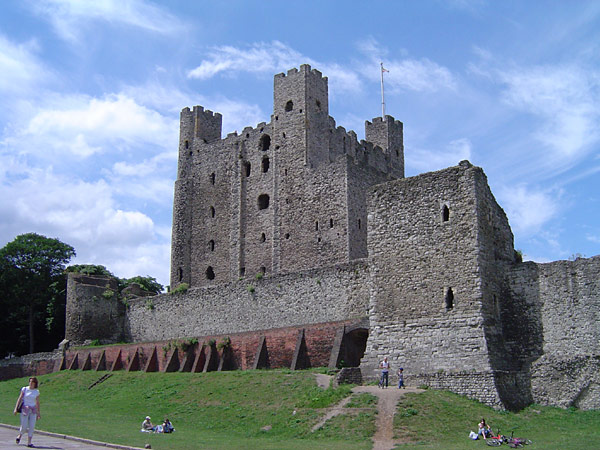
Rochester Castle (1127)

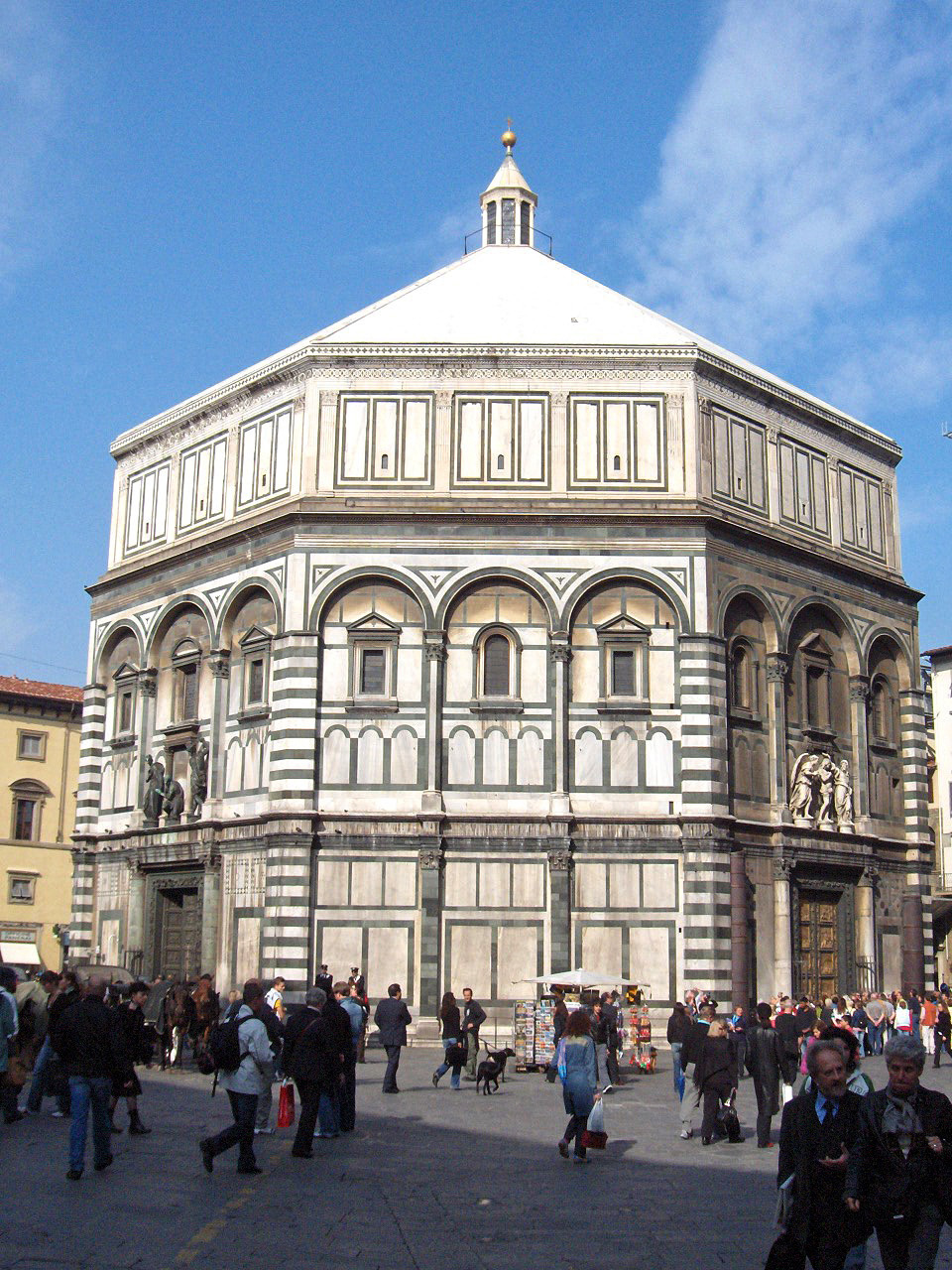
Florence Baptistry (1128)

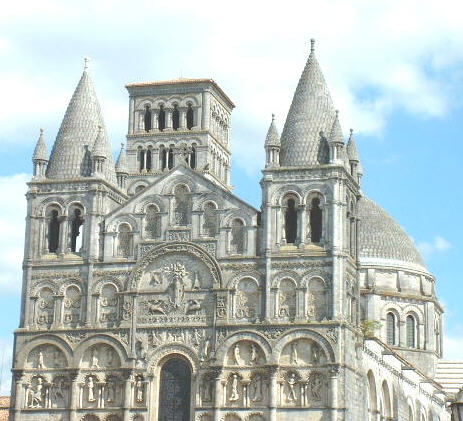
Angoulême Cathedral (1128)

== Deaths ==
- 1124 – March 15 – Ernulf, French-born Benedictine Bishop of Rochester and architect (b. c.1040)
