= 1140s in architecture =

- 1130s
- 1140s in architecture
- 1150s
Other topics in 1140s:
- Art

== Buildings and structures ==
=== Buildings ===
- About 1140
  - Church of Santa Maria e San Donato in Murano, Republic of Venice completed.
  - Rudra Mahalaya Temple in Siddhpur, India, completed.
  - Church of St Mary and St David, Kilpeck, and first stone Church of St John the Evangelist, Shobdon, both by members of the Herefordshire School in England, built.
  - Great church of Cîteaux Abbey begun.
- 1143 – In the Kingdom of Sicily
  - Trani Cathedral completed (except the campanile).
  - Mosaic decoration of Cappella Palatina in Palazzo dei Normanni, Palermo, partly completed.
- 1144: June 11 – Basilica of St Denis near Paris in the Kingdom of France consecrated, the first Gothic church.
- 1145 – Basilica of Sainte-Trinité, Cherbourg-en-Cotentin, Normandy, consecrated.
- 1147
  - Basilica of San Frediano in Lucca completed.
  - Saint-Pierre de Montmartre in Paris consecrated.
- 1149 – Akebäck Church on Gotland is inaugurated.
- 1149: July 15 – Church of the Holy Sepulchre in Jerusalem consecrated after reconstruction.
- Probable decade – Lyngsjö Church, Sweden, built.
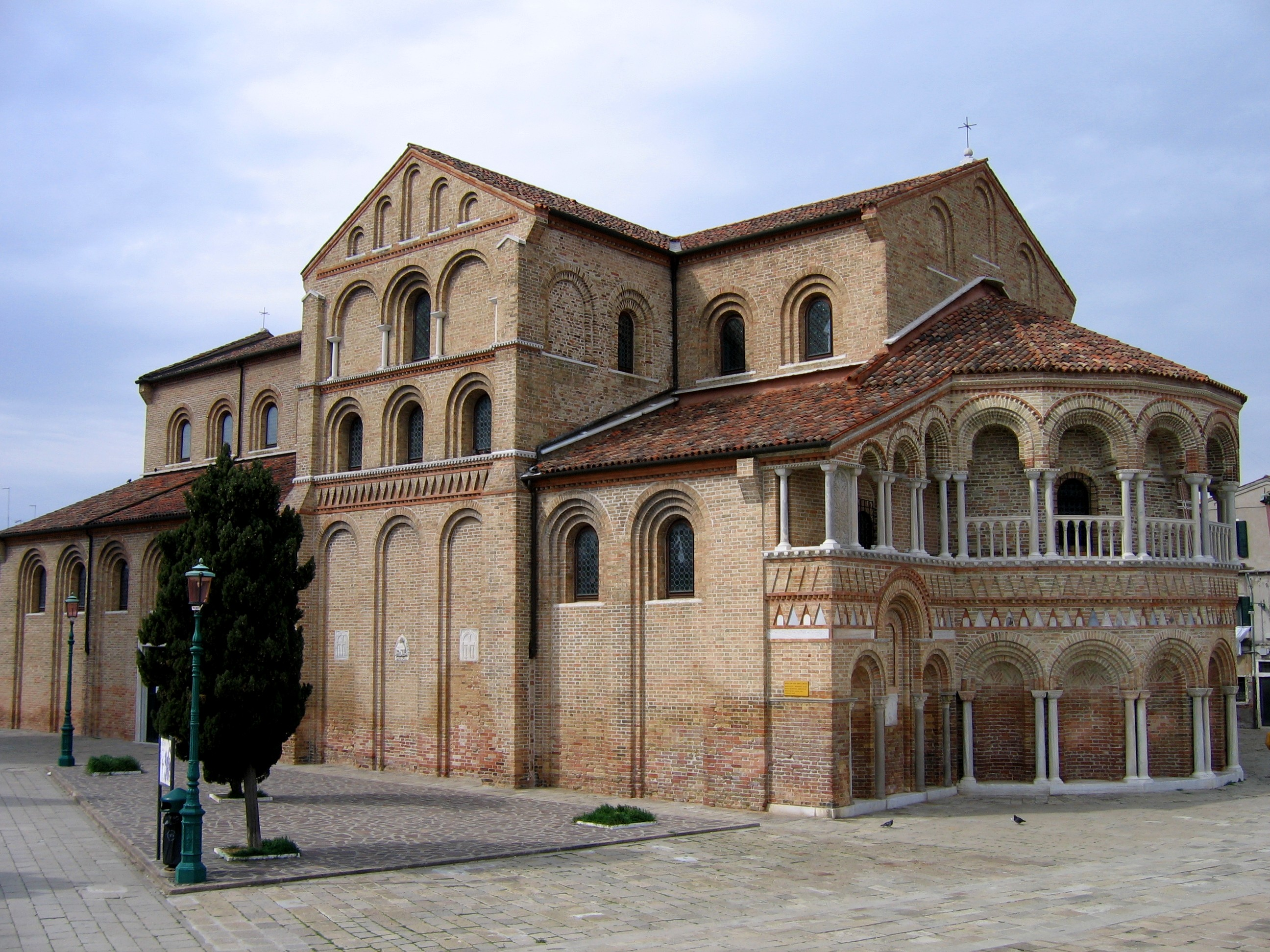
Santi Maria e Donato, Murano (c. 1140)

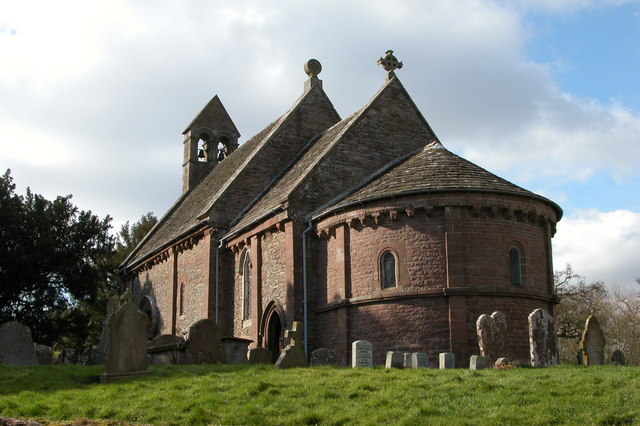
SS Mary and David's Church, Kilpeck (c. 1140)

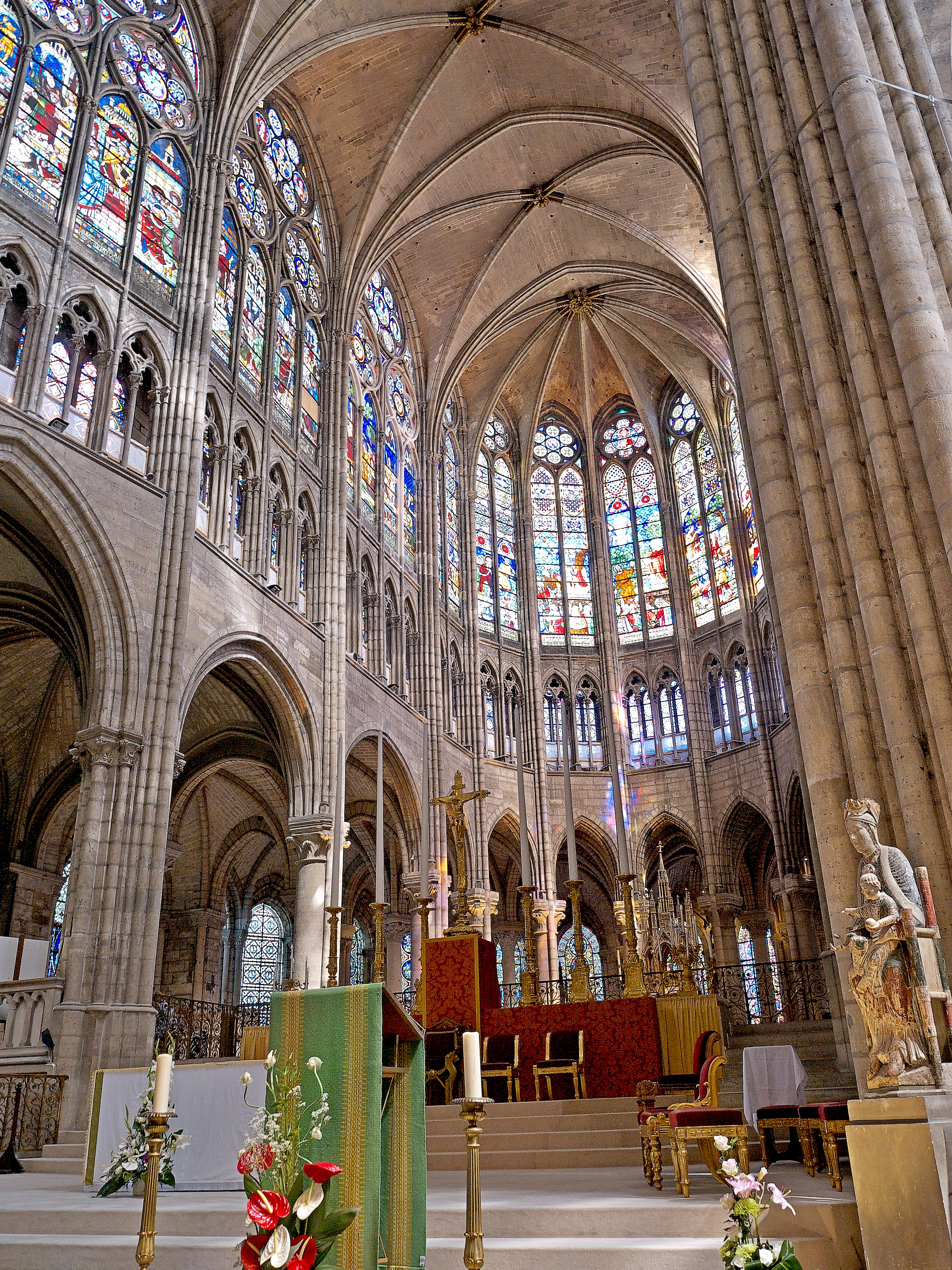
Basilica of St Denis (1144)

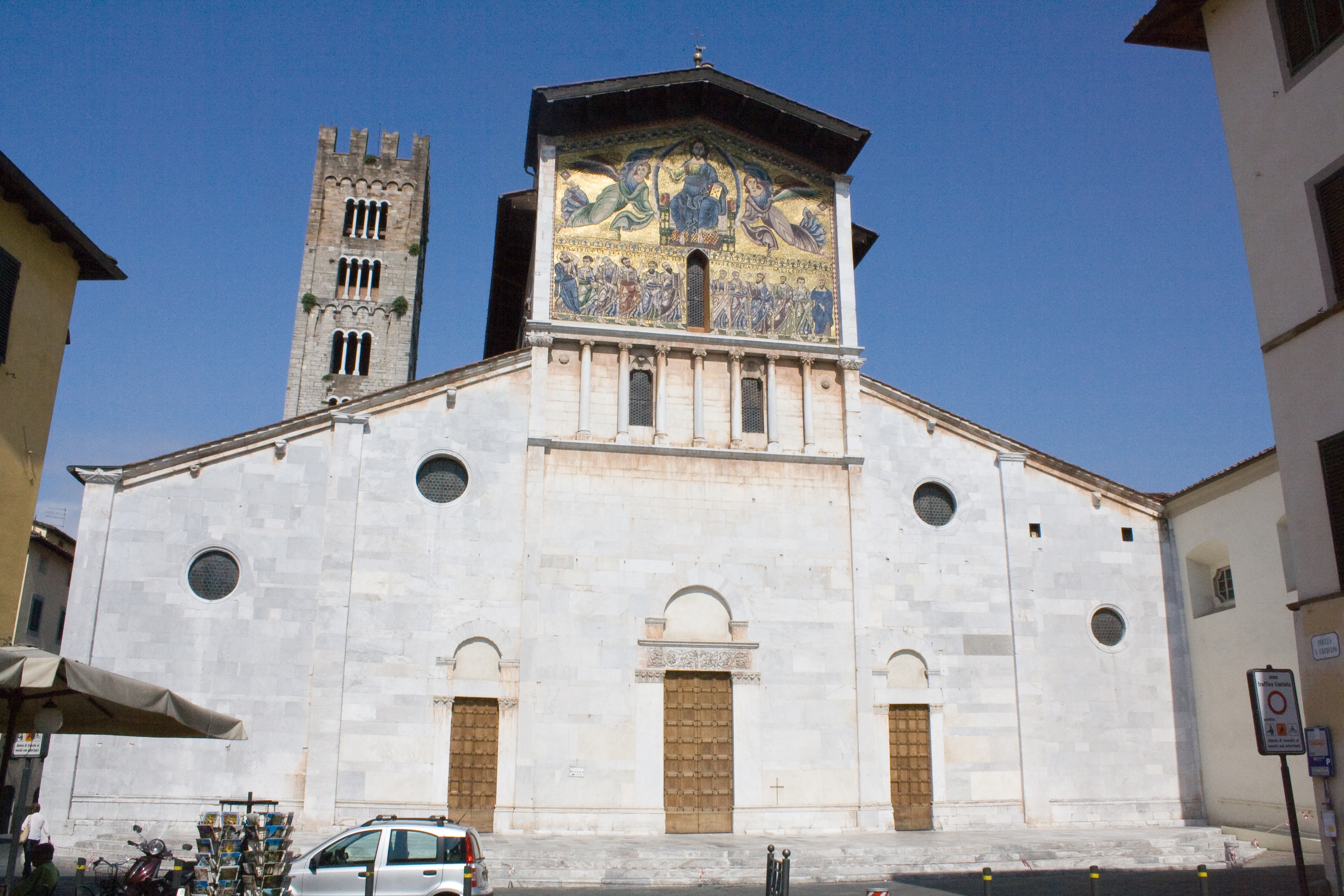
Basilica di San Frediano, Lucca (1147)

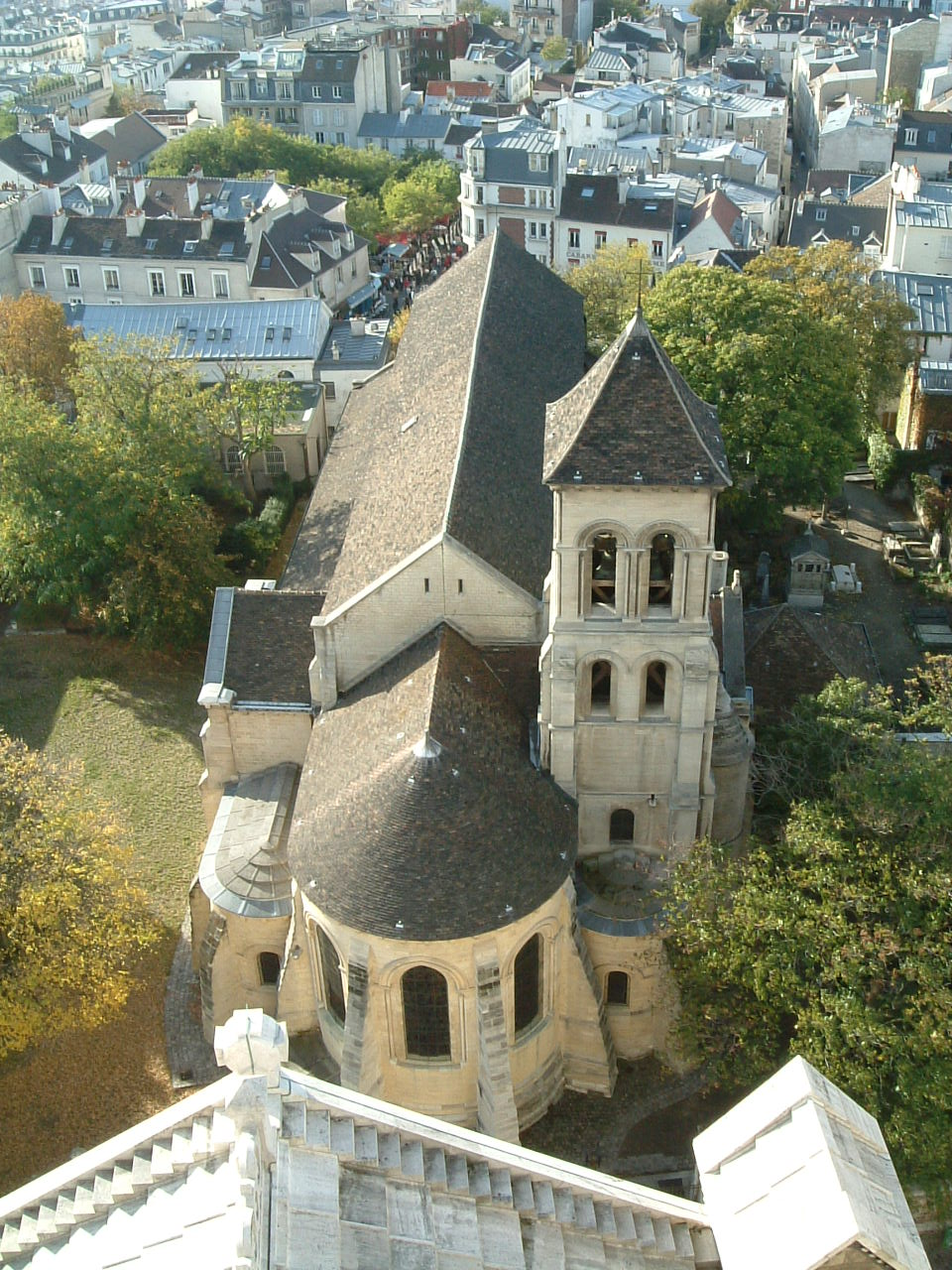
Saint Pierre, Montmartre (1147)

== Births ==
- Adela of Champagne, Queen of France
- Alan Fitz Walter, High Steward of Scotland
- Eliezer ben Joel HaLevi, German rabbi
