= 1090s in architecture =

- 1080s
- 1090s in architecture
- 1100s

Architecture timeline

== Buildings and structures ==
=== Buildings ===
- About 1090
  - Abbey Church of Saint-Savin-sur-Gartempe completed (begun about 1040).
  - Construction of city Walls of Ávila in Spain begins.
- About 1090–1094 – Minaret of Great Mosque of Aleppo in Syria built (destroyed 2013).
- 1090 – Javeri temple is built in Khajuraho, Chandela kingdom.
- 1091
  - Cairo Fatimid city wall built (begun in 1087).
  - Ananda Temple built in Bagan, Pagan Kingdom capital.
- 1093
  - Second of the Kharraqan towers mausoleums built in Qazvin, Seljukid Iran.
  - Durham Cathedral in the north of England founded.
  - Ely Cathedral in the east of England founded.
- 1094
  - 40-foot-tall water-powered astronomical clocktower in Song dynasty's capital Bianjing designed by Su Song completed.
  - San Juan de la Peña Monastery consecrated.
  - Earliest parts of the Old Synagogue (Erfurt), Germany, one of the oldest synagogue buildings in Europe, dated back to this year.
- About 1094 – Battle Abbey in the south of England consecrated.
- 1095 – Sant'Abbondio, Como in Lombardy consecrated.
- 1096
  - St. Sernin's Basilica, Toulouse consecrated.
  - Norwich Cathedral in the east of England begun.
- 1097
  - Construction of the original stage of the Flower Pagoda in the Temple of the Six Banyan Trees in Guangzhou, Song dynasty.
  - Djamaa el Kebir mosque of Algiers built in Almoravid Algeria.
- 1099 – Modena Cathedral begun.
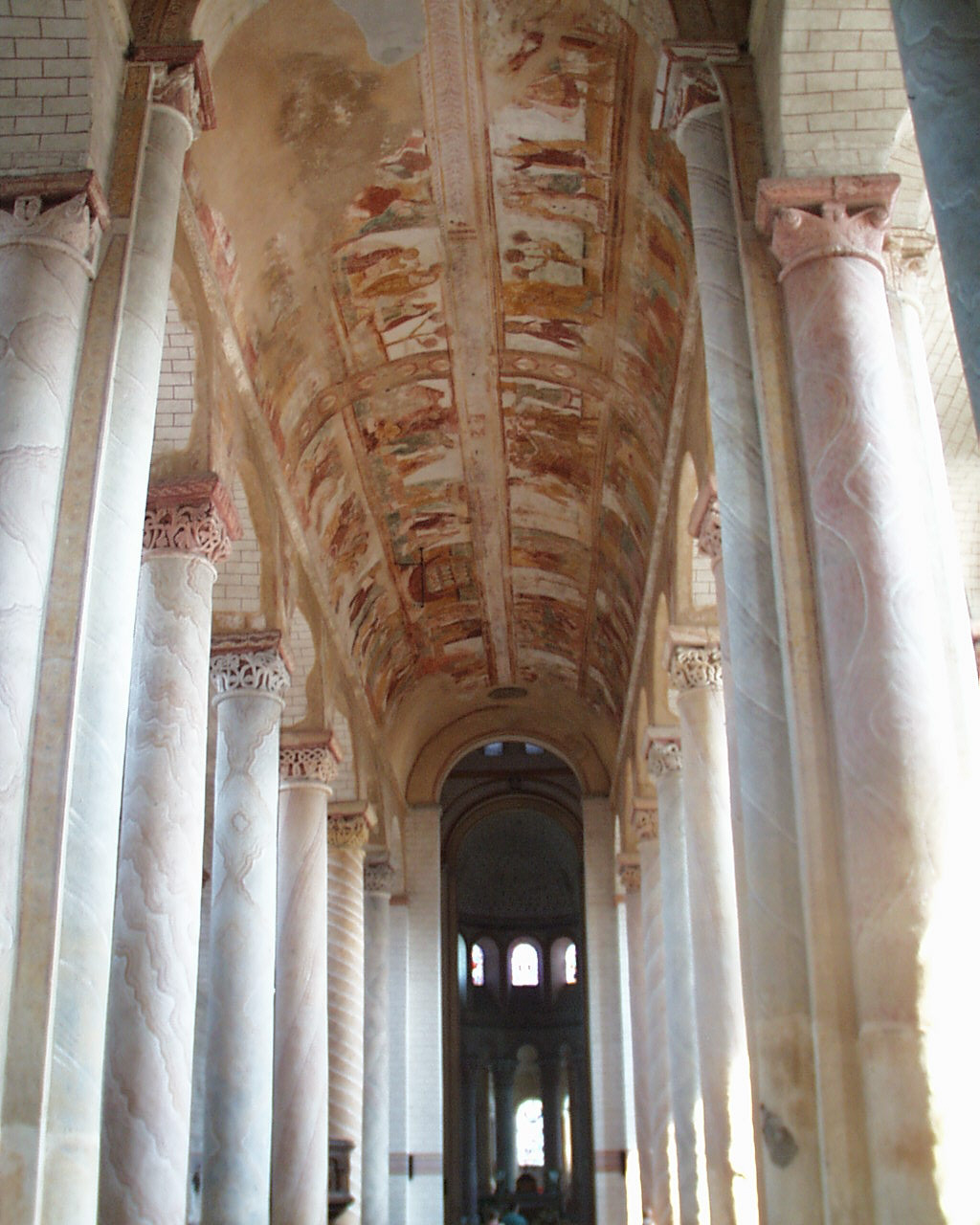
Abbey Church of Saint-Savin-sur-Gartempe (1090)

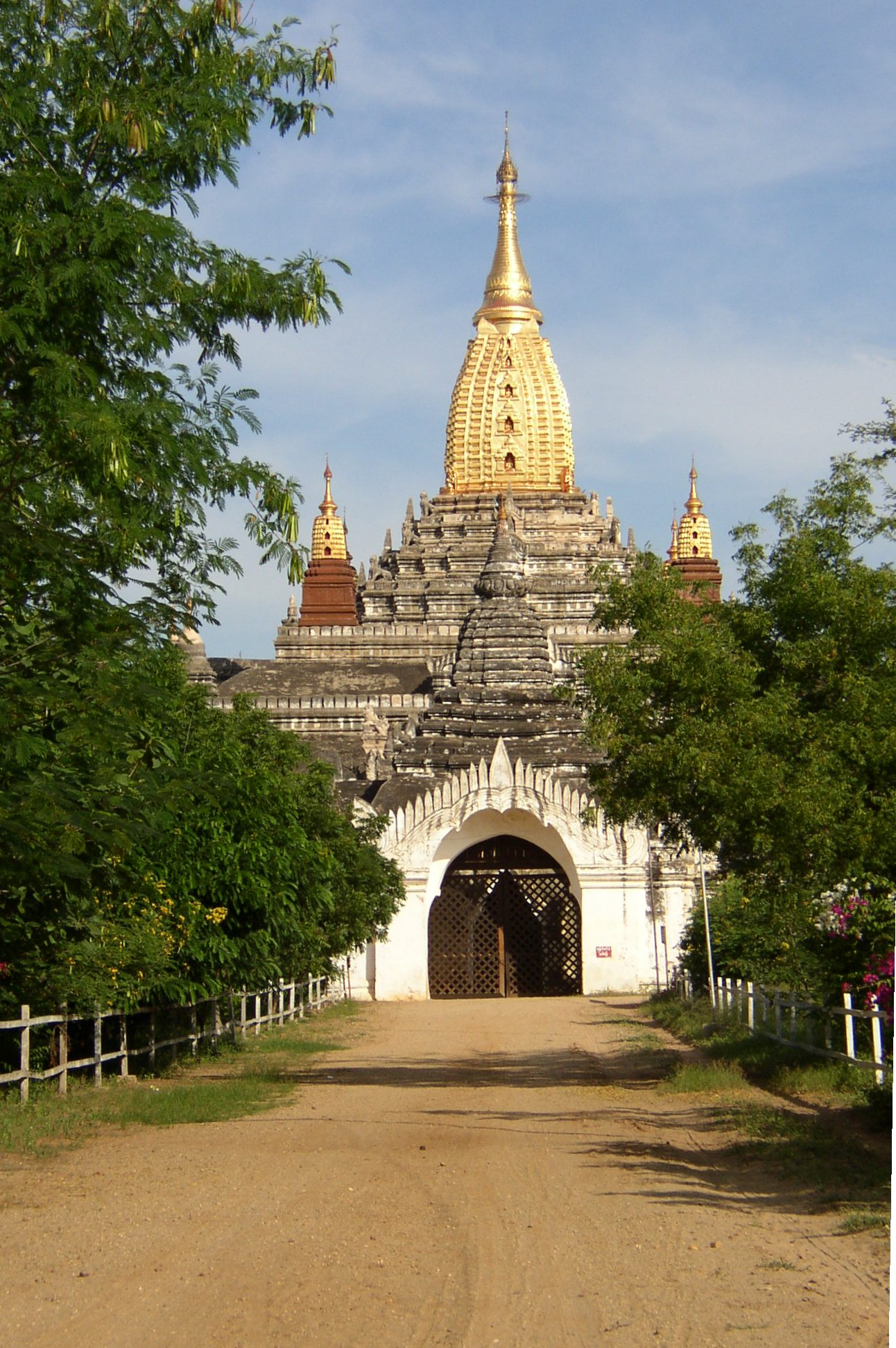
Ananda Temple, Bagan (1091)

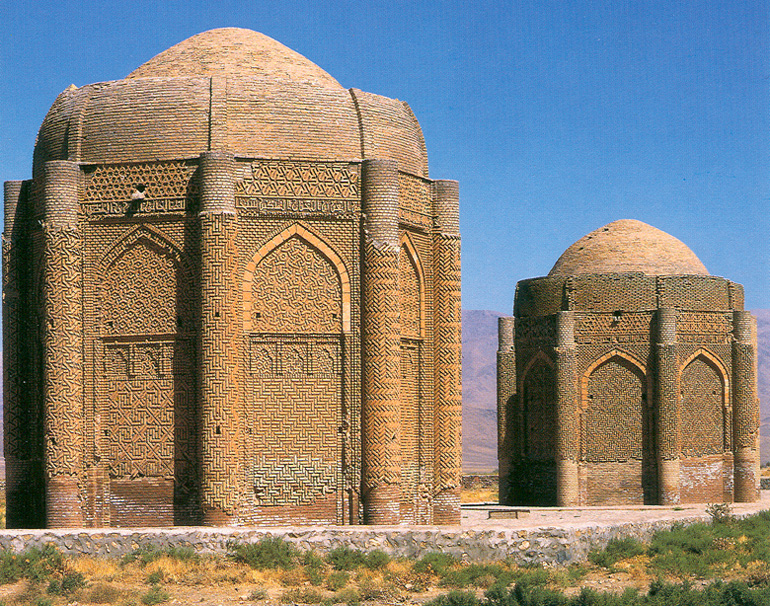
Kharaghan Towers (mausoleums) of Qazvin (1093)

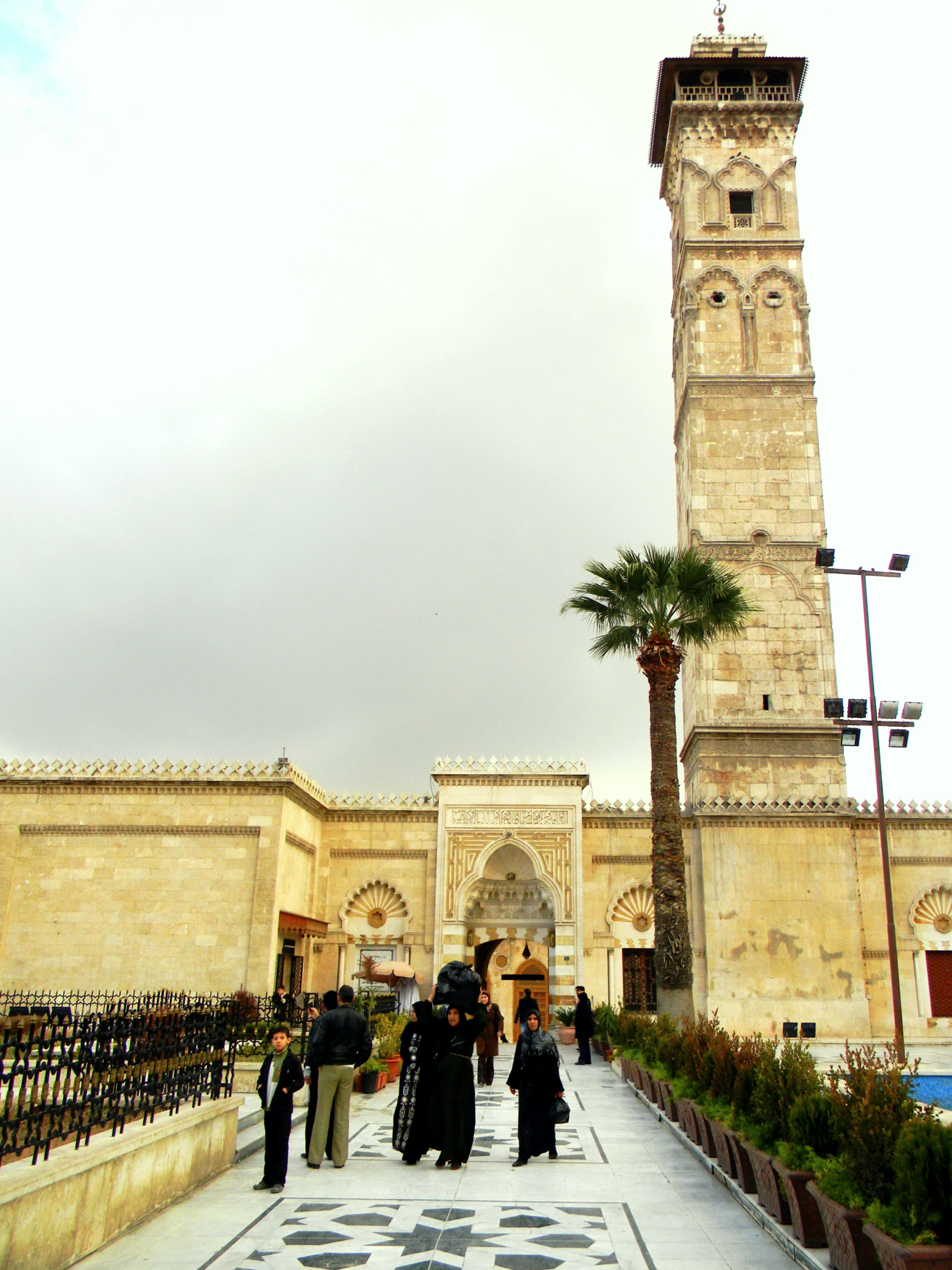
Great Mosque of Aleppo minaret (1094)

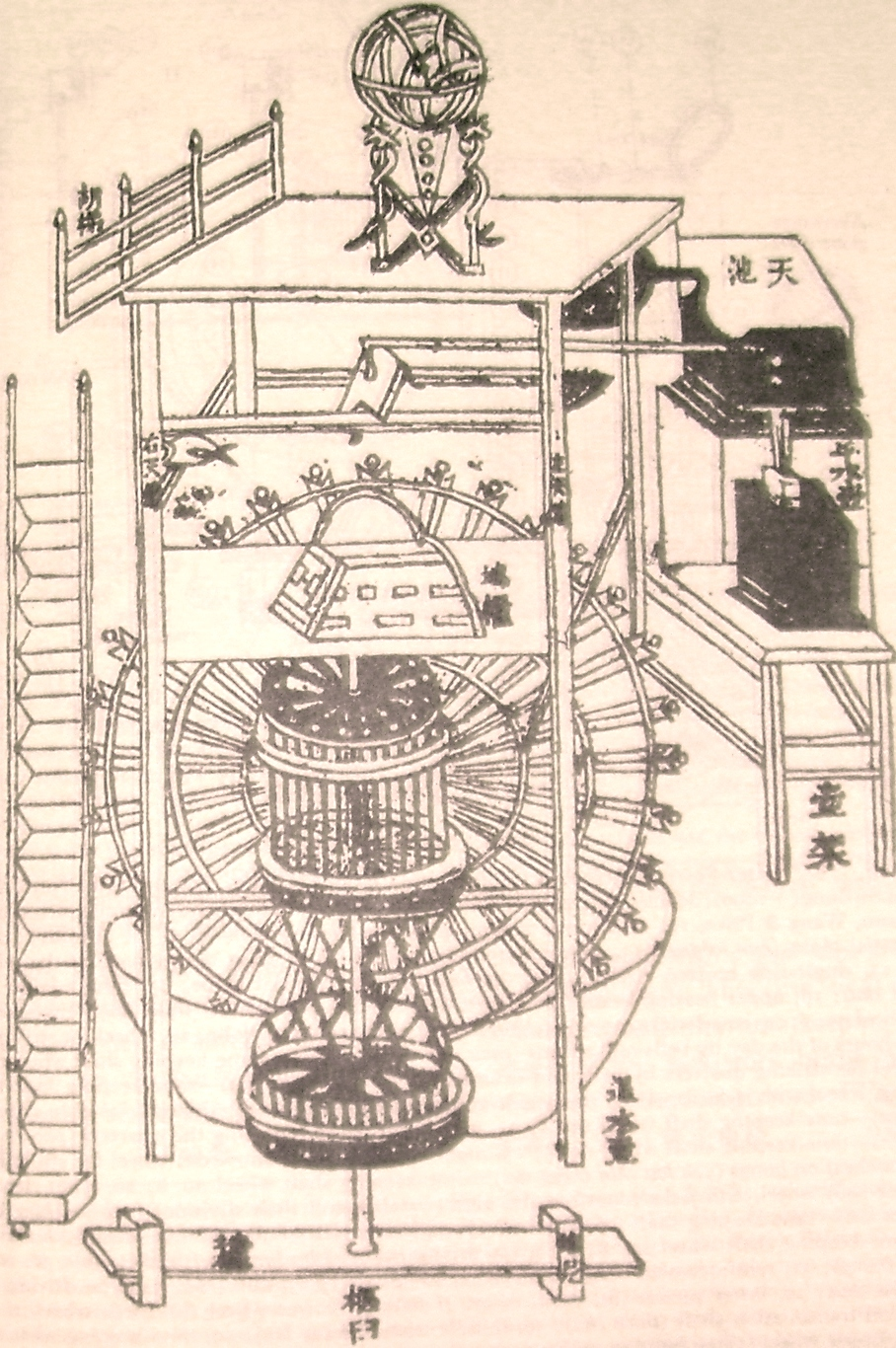
Su Song's astronomical clocktower in Bianjing (1094)

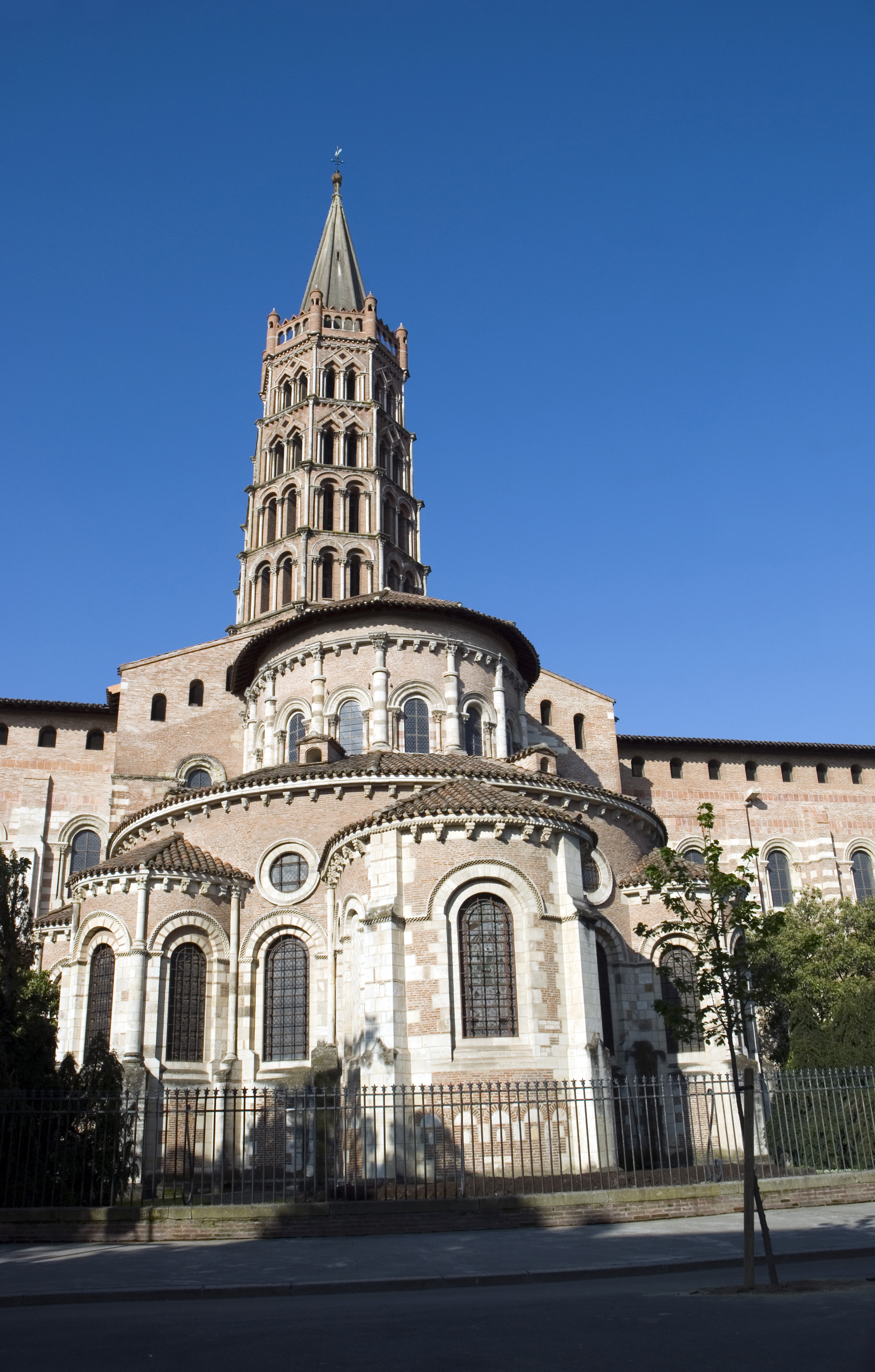
Chevet of St. Sernin's Basilica, Toulouse (1095)

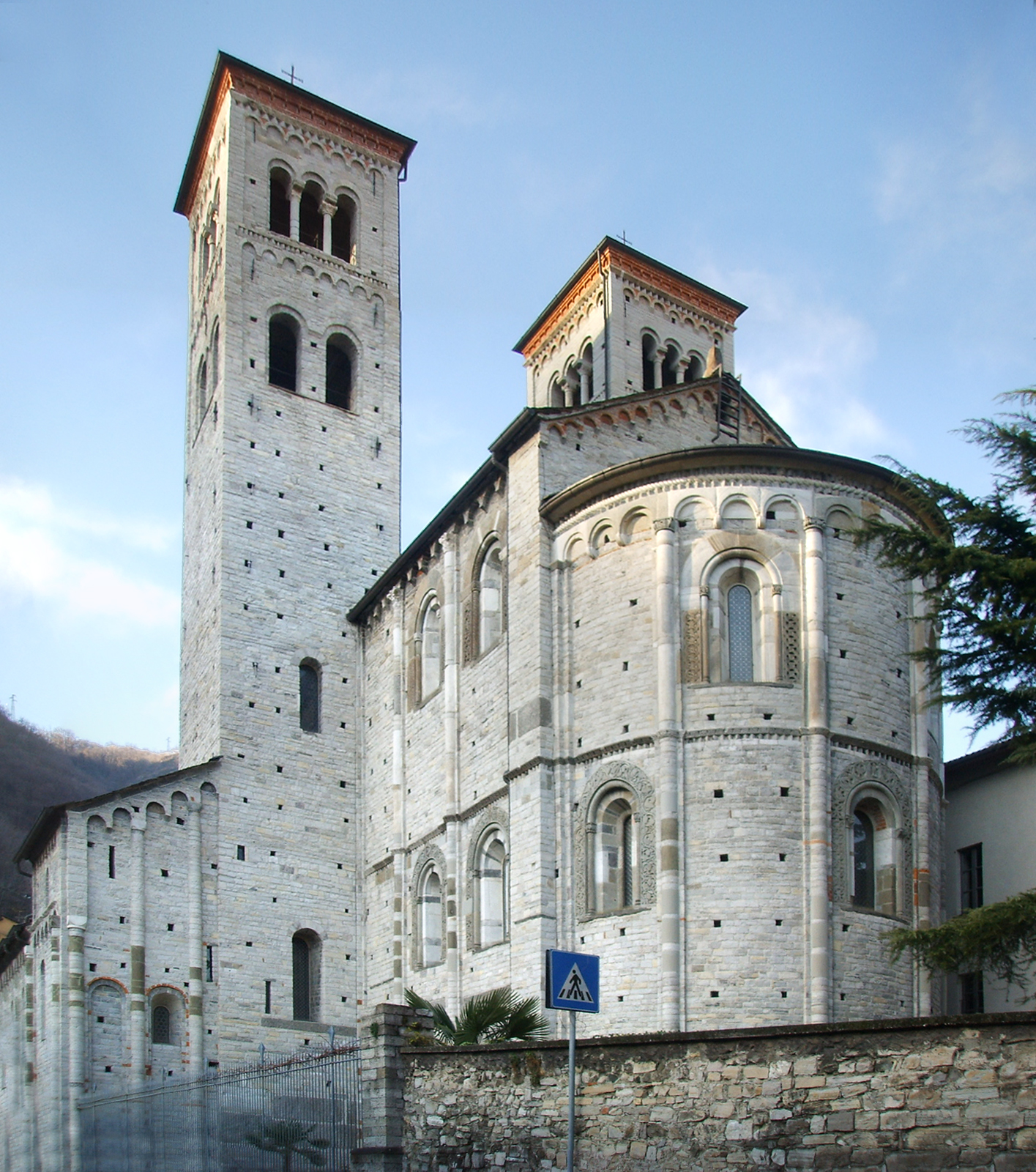
Basilica of Sant'Abbondio (1095)

Flower Pagoda in the Temple of the Six Banyan Trees, Guangzhou (1097)
