= 1130s in architecture =

- 1120s
- 1130s in architecture
- 1140s

Architecture timeline

== Buildings and structures ==
=== Buildings ===
- 1130
  - Construction of Abbaye aux Dames, Caen, Normandy, completed (begun in 1062).
  - Canterbury Cathedral, England, consecrated.
  - Rochester Cathedral, England, consecrated.
  - New west front of Église Notre-Dame la Grande, Poitiers, begun.
- about 1130
  - Keep of Hedingham Castle, England, begun.
  - Urnes Stave Church built in Norway.
- 1131 – Cathedral of Cefalù begun.
- 1132
  - San Pietro in Ciel d'Oro, Pavia, consecrated.
  - San Giovanni degli Eremiti in Palermo, Norman Kingdom of Sicily built.
  - Fountains Abbey begun in England
- 1133
  - Rebuilding of Clairvaux Abbey begun.
  - Construction of Angkor Wat begun.
  - San Sisto, Pisa, Italy, consecrated.
- 1135
  - Basilica di San Zeno in Verona, Italy, rebuilt to its current form.
  - Nave vault of Durham Cathedral, England, completed.
- 1136
  - Glasgow Cathedral in Scotland consecrated.
  - Work begins on the narthex of the Basilique Saint-Denis in Saint-Denis, France.
  - Reconstruction of the Great Mosque of Tlemcen in Almoravid Algeria
- 1138 – San Paolo a Ripa d'Arno in Pisa, Italy, rebuilt to its current form.
- 1139
  - Verona Cathedral begun.
  - Fontenay Abbey begun.
- about 1139 – Construction of Castle Rising in Norfolk, England, begins.
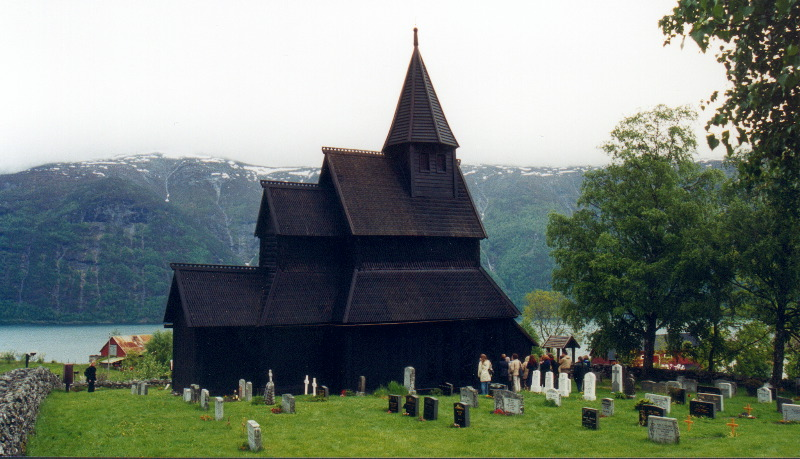
Urnes Stave Church ( about 1130)

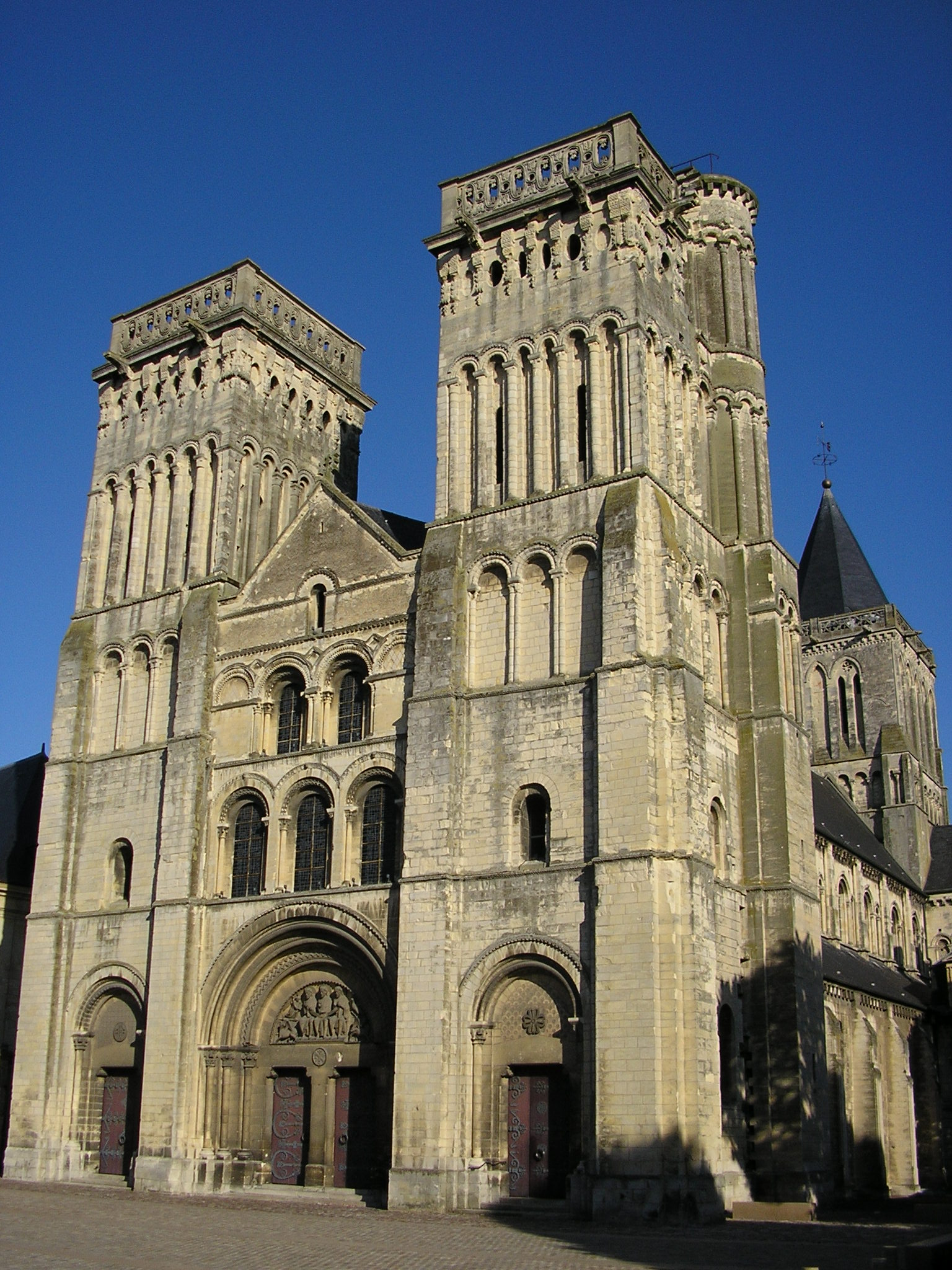
Abbaye aux Dames, Caen (1130)

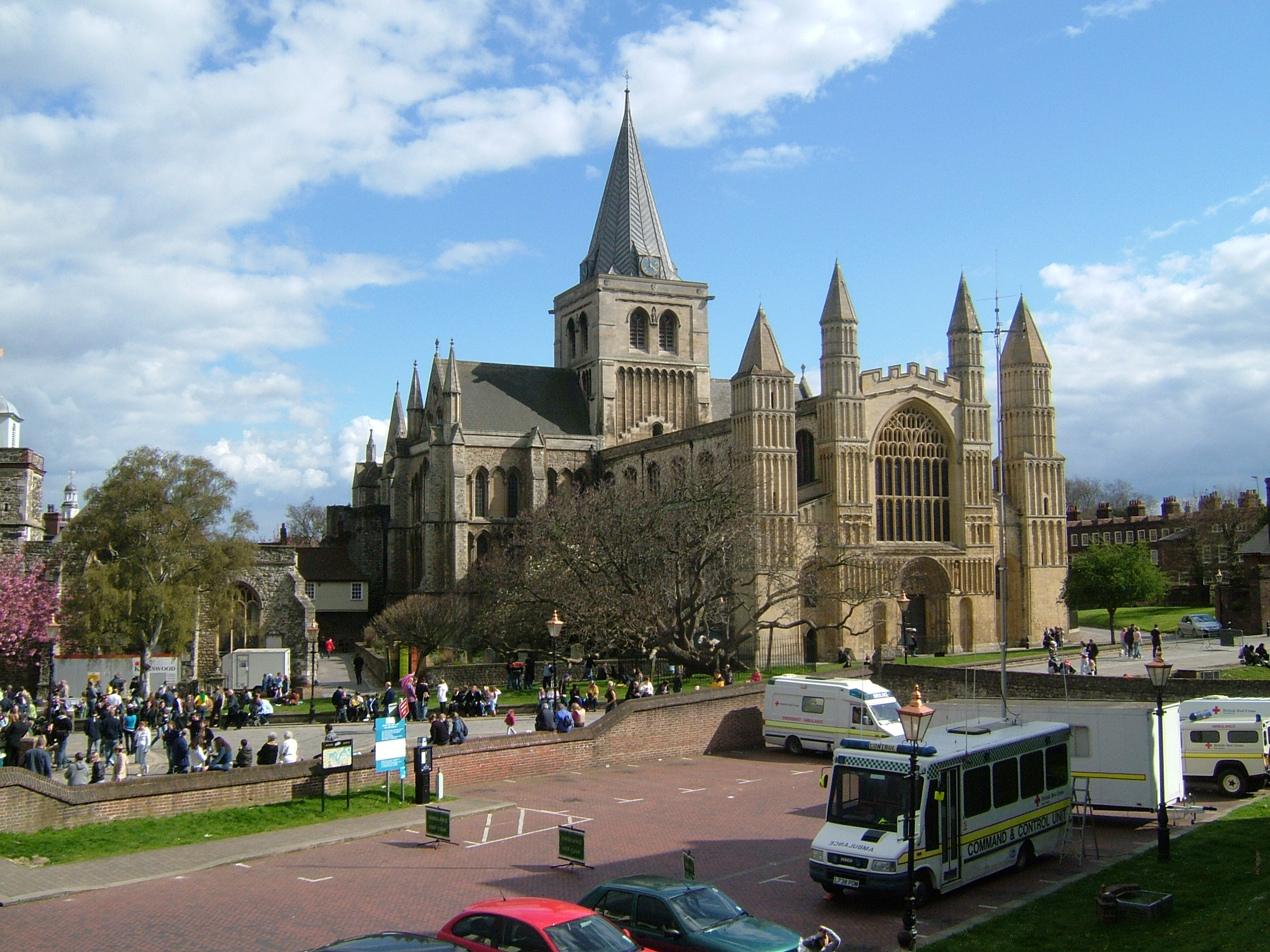
Rochester Cathedral (1130)

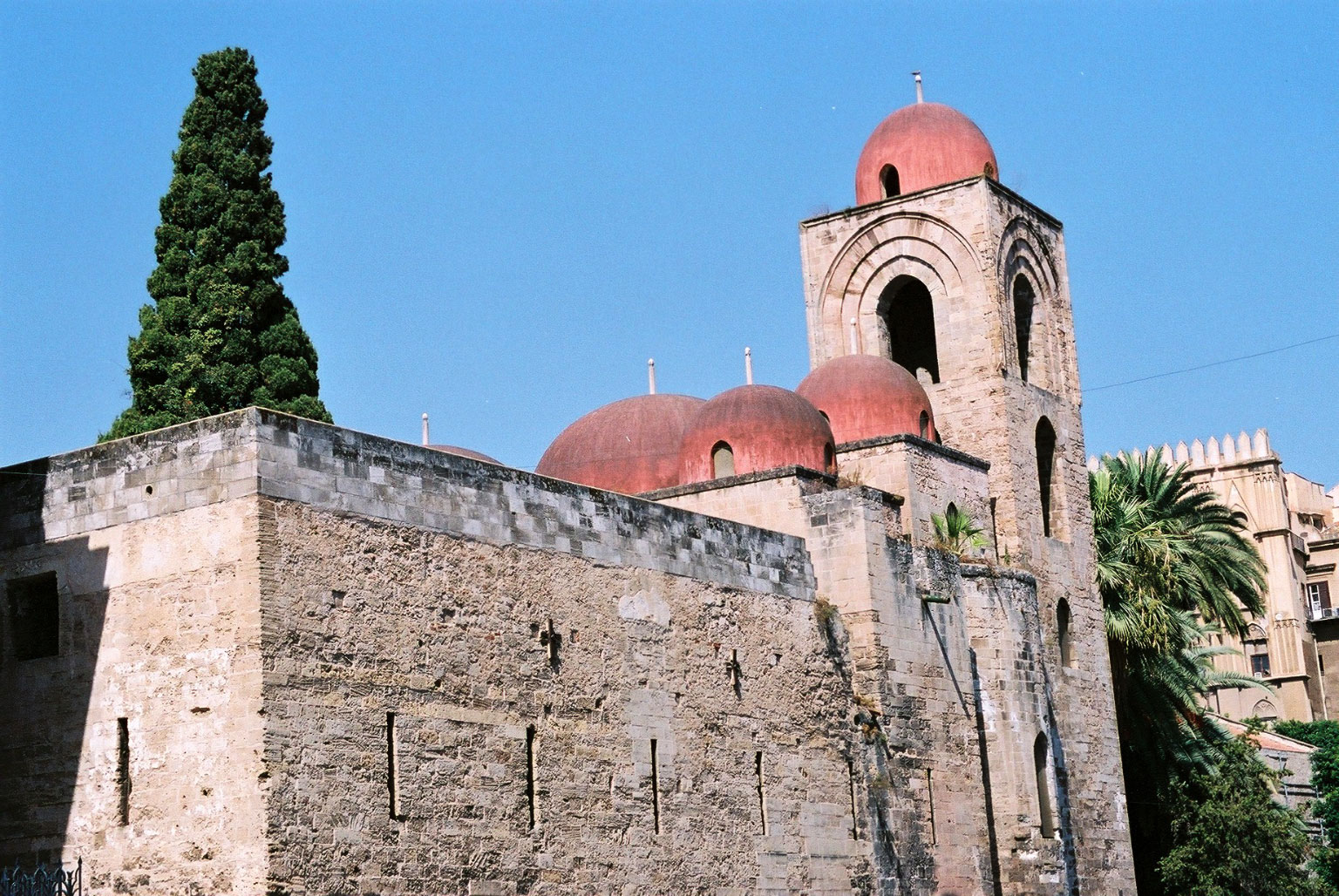
San Giovanni degli Eremiti, Palermo (1132)

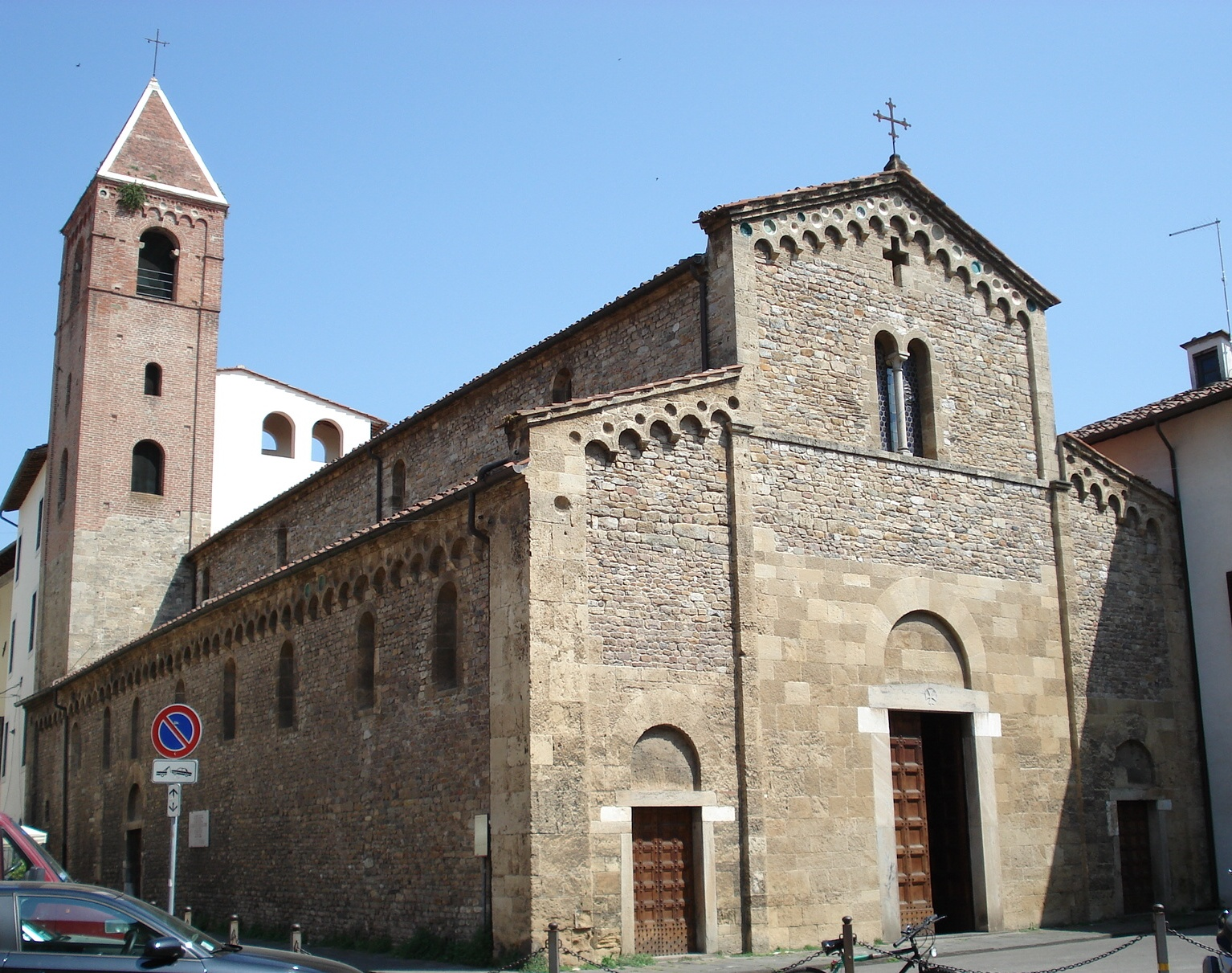
San Sisto, Pisa (1133)

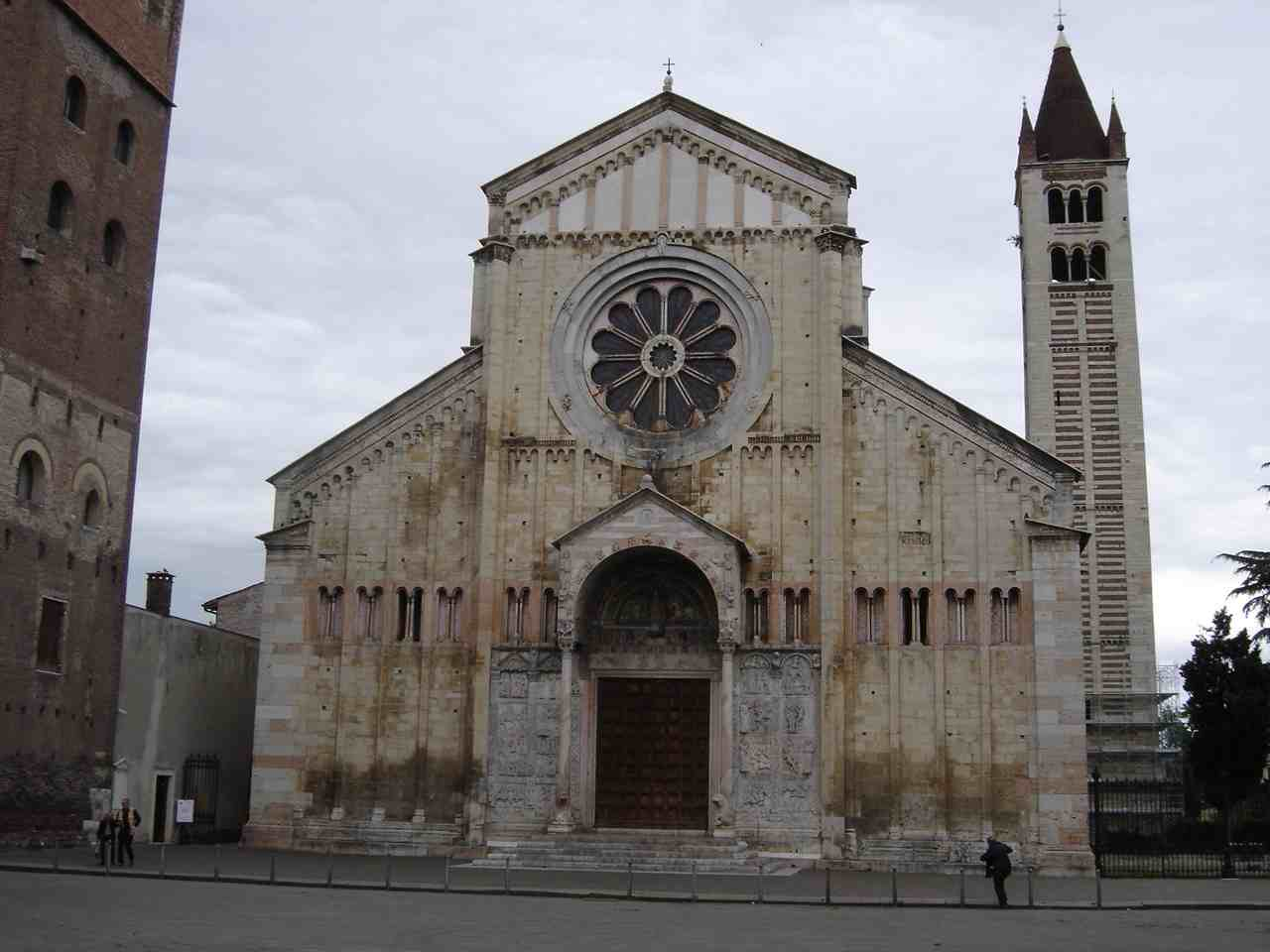
Basilica di San Zeno, Verona (1135)

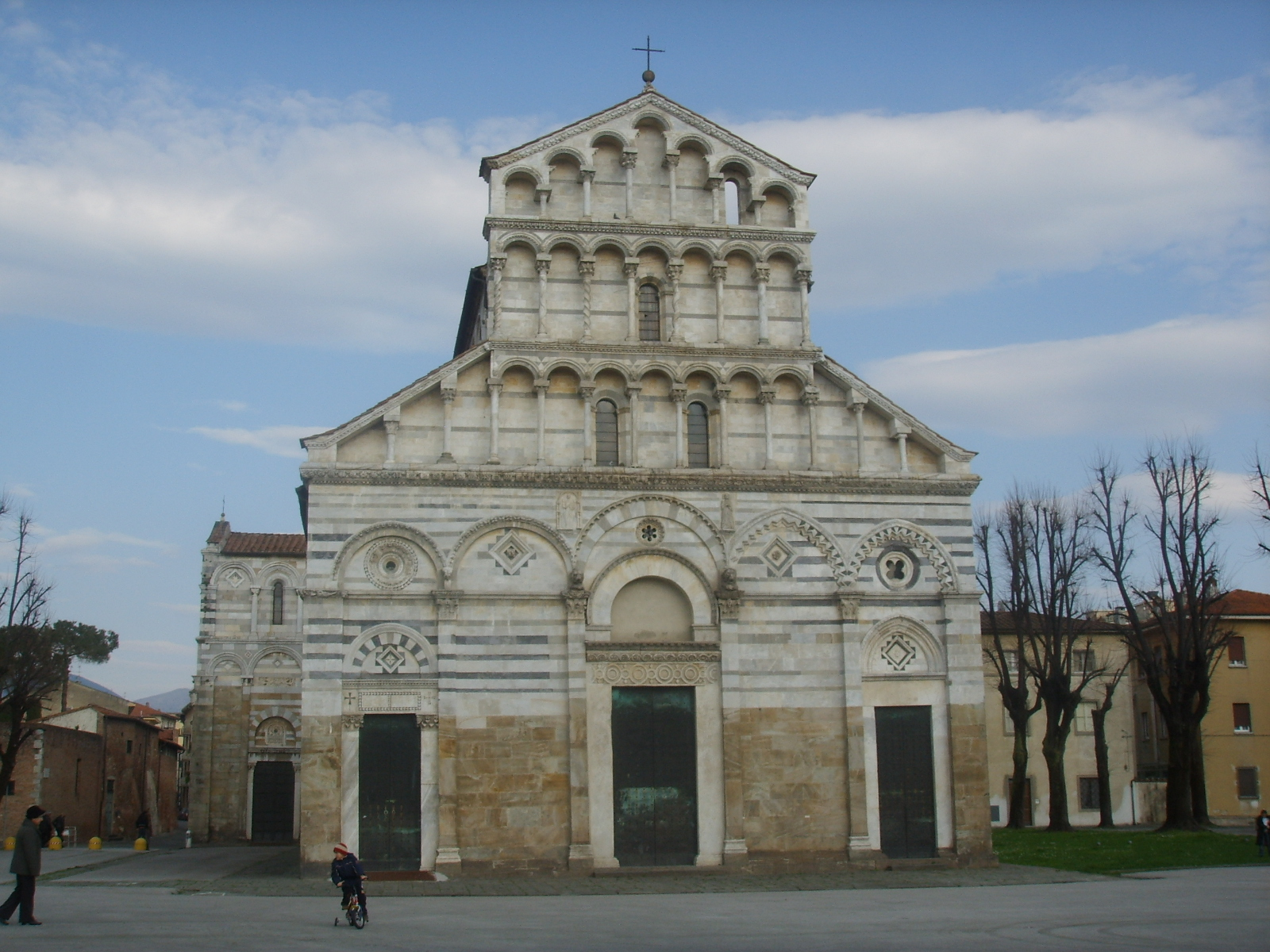
San Paolo a Ripa d'Arno, Pisa (1138)
