= 1110s in architecture =

- 1100s
- 1110s in architecture
- 1120s

Architecture timeline

== Buildings and structures ==
=== Buildings ===
- 1110 – Reconstruction of Cathedral St Pierre of Angoulême begun.
- 1110 – Original building of the Worms Cathedral, Holy Roman Empire consecrated (building now mostly disappeared).
- 1110 – Chaturbhuja temple is built in Khajuraho, Chandela kingdom.
- 1111 – Bamberg Cathedral in the Holy Roman Empire consecrated.
- 1112 – Mahadeva Temple of Itagi in the Western Chalukya Empire, India is built.
- about 1113–1150 – Construction of Angkor Wat, Cambodia.
- 1114 – Lakshmi Devi temple, Doddagaddavalli built in the Hoysala Kingdom.
- 1115 – Cloister of the Saint-Pierre abbey in Moissac, France built.
- 1117 – Reconstruction of San Zeno Maggiore in Verona, Italy begun.
- 1117 – Chennakesava Temple, Belur, India (Hoysala Empire) commissioned by King Vishnuvardhana.
- 1117 – Almoravid Koubba in Marrakesh built.
- 1118 – Pisa Cathedral in Piazza dei Miracoli, Pisa, March of Tuscany consecrated (begun in 1063).
- 1118 – Romanesque reconstruction of the Carolingian Abbey of Sant'Antimo near Siena, Italy, begun.
- 1118 – Reconstruction of the Early Medieval building of Santa Maria in Cosmedin, Rome, begun.
- 1119 – Completion of the Two Towers, Bologna.
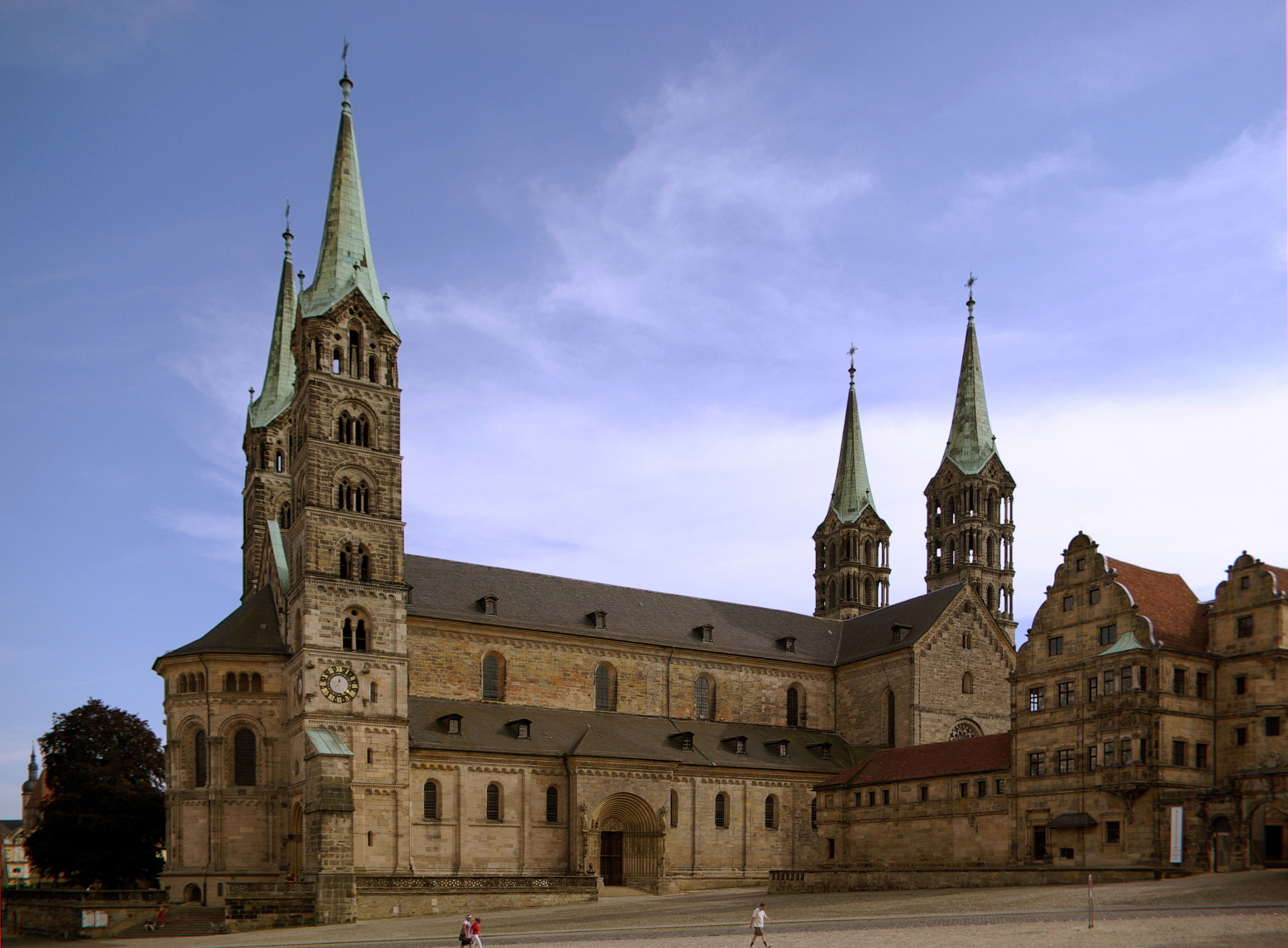
Bamberg Cathedral (1111)

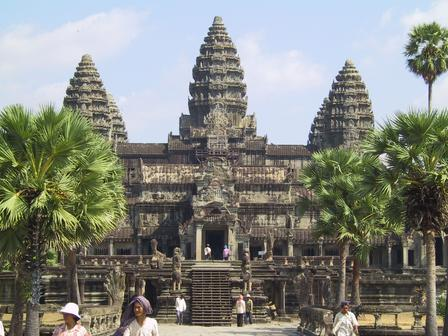
Angkor Wat (1113–1150)

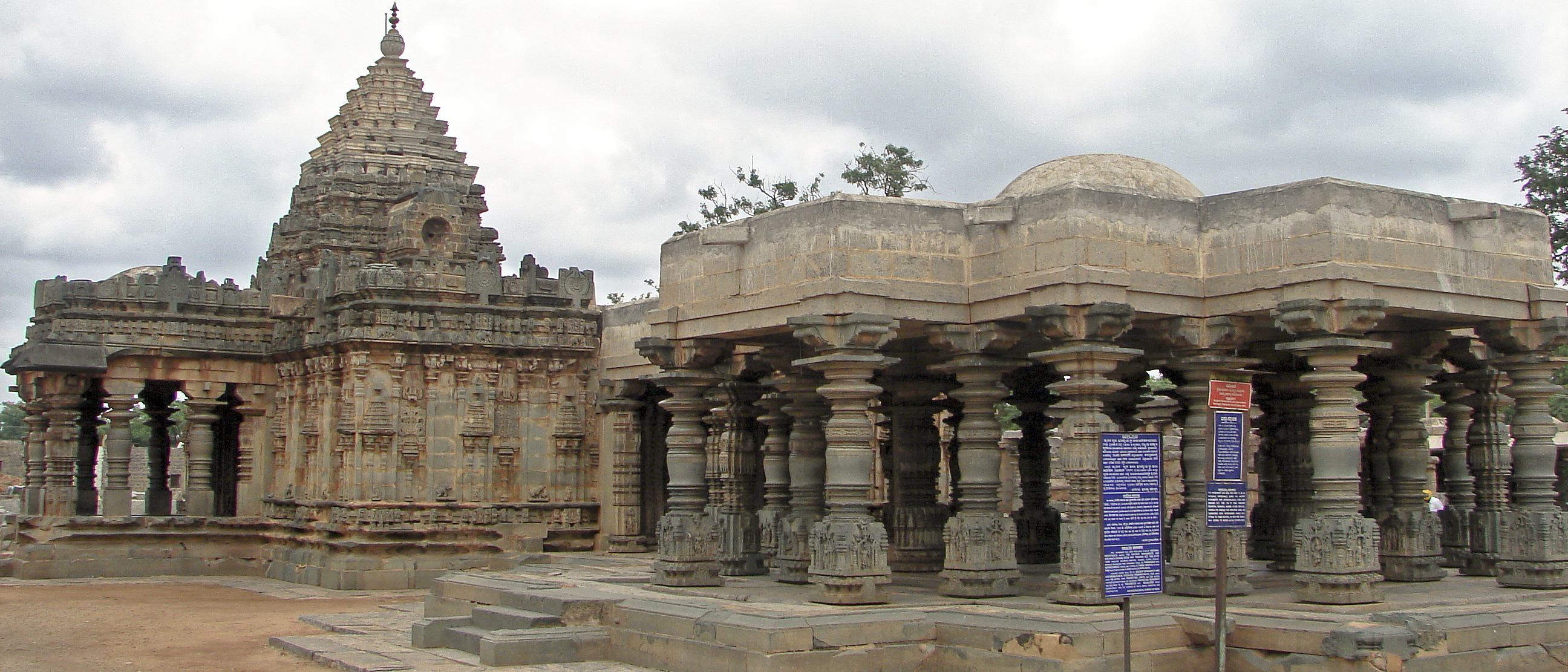
Mahadeva Temple of Itagi (1112)

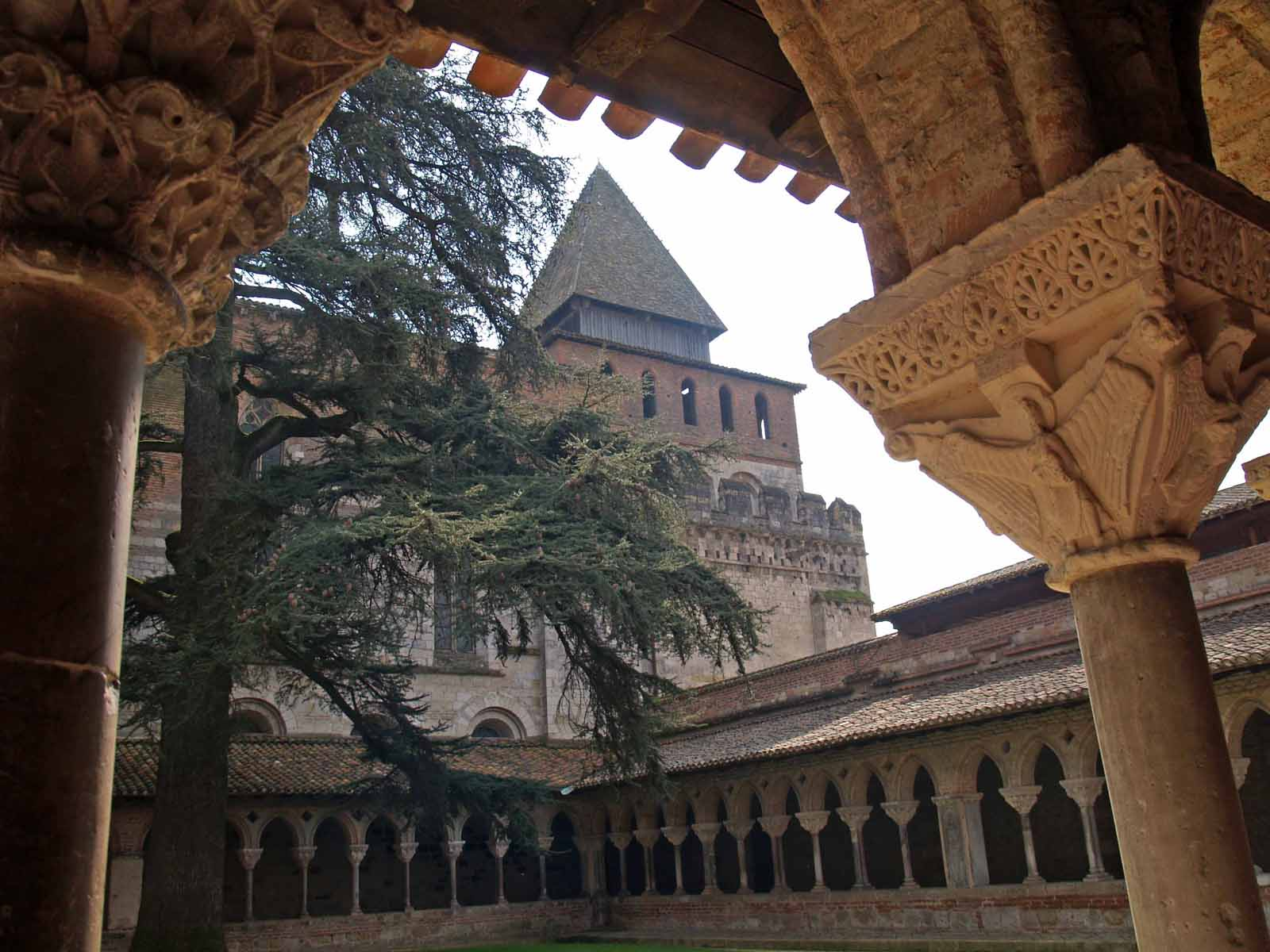
Saint-Pierre abbey in Moissac (1115)

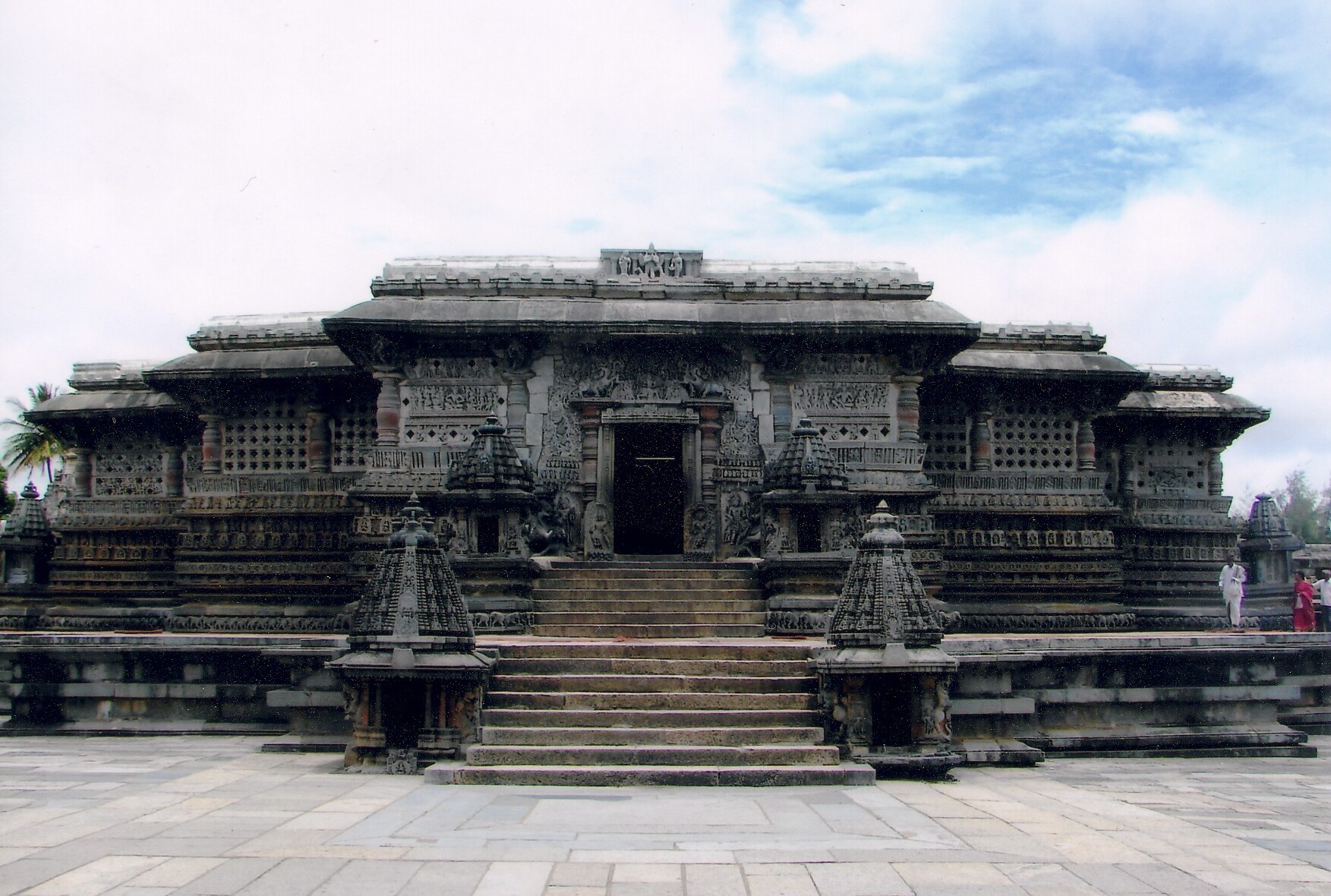
Chennakesava Temple of Belur (1117)

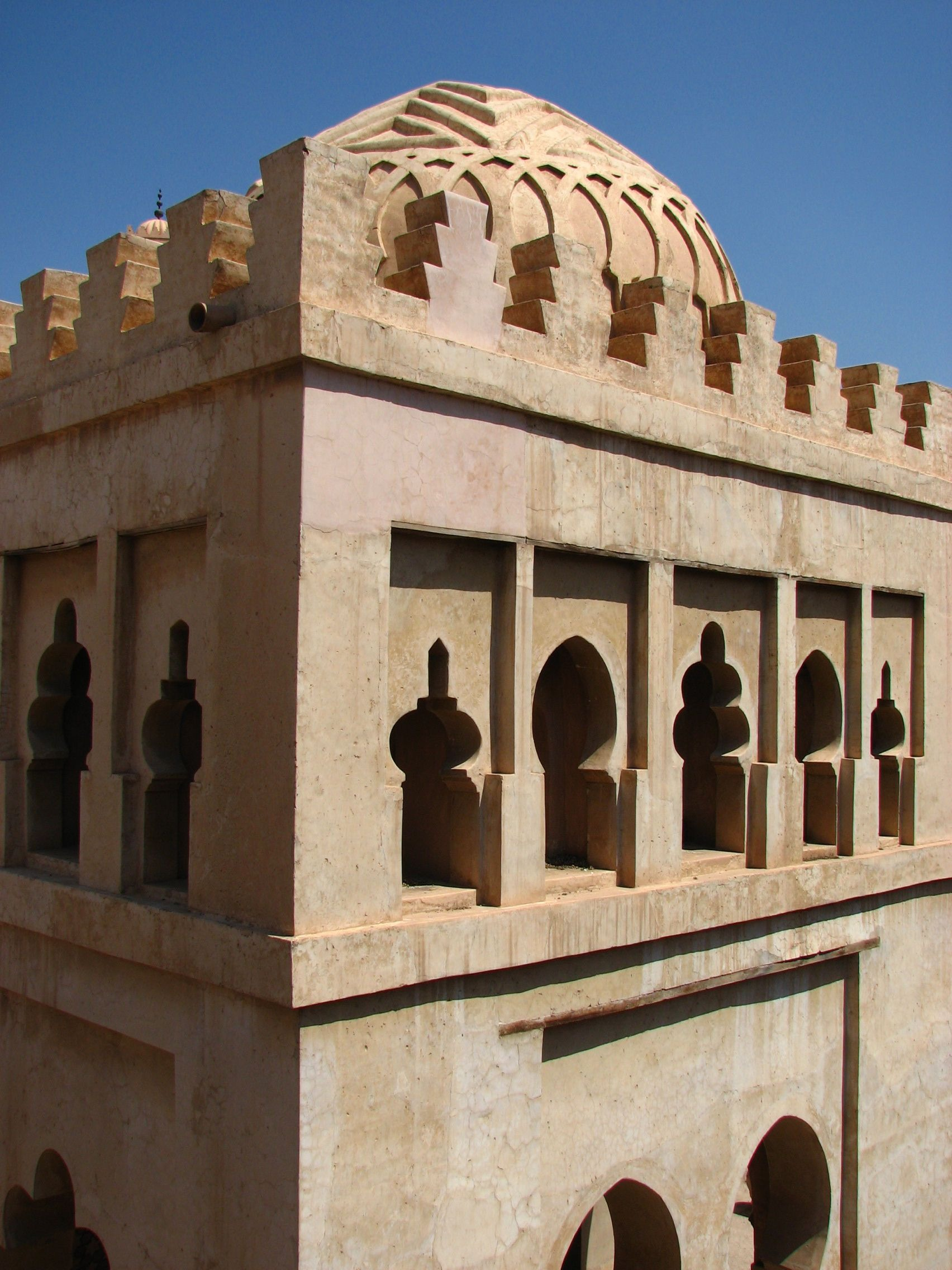
Almoravid Koubba of Marrakesh (1117)

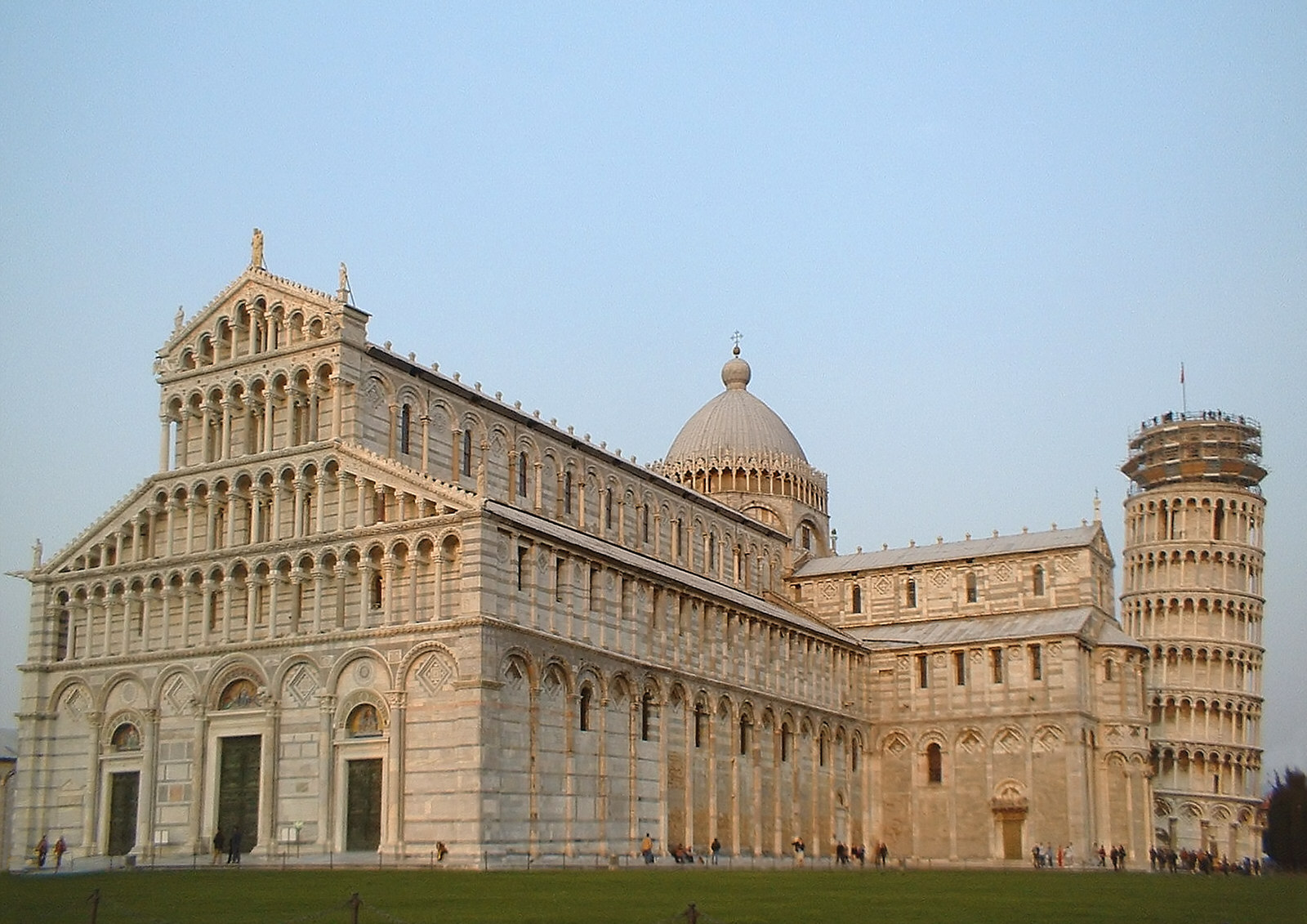
Duomo of Pisa (1118)

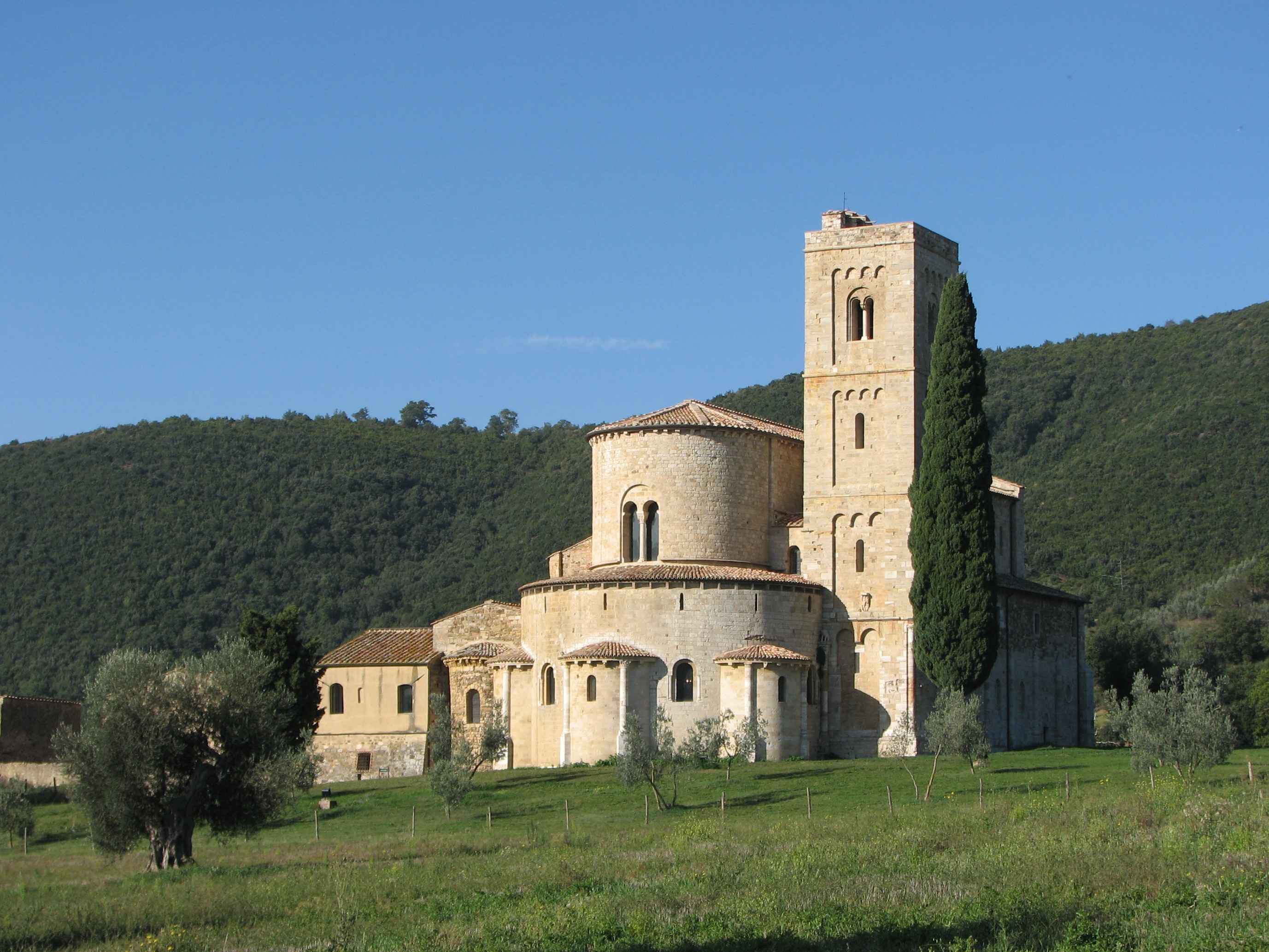
St. Antimo's Abbey (1118)
