= 1100s in architecture =

- 1090s
- 1100s in architecture
- 1110s

Architecture timeline

== Buildings and structures ==
=== Buildings ===
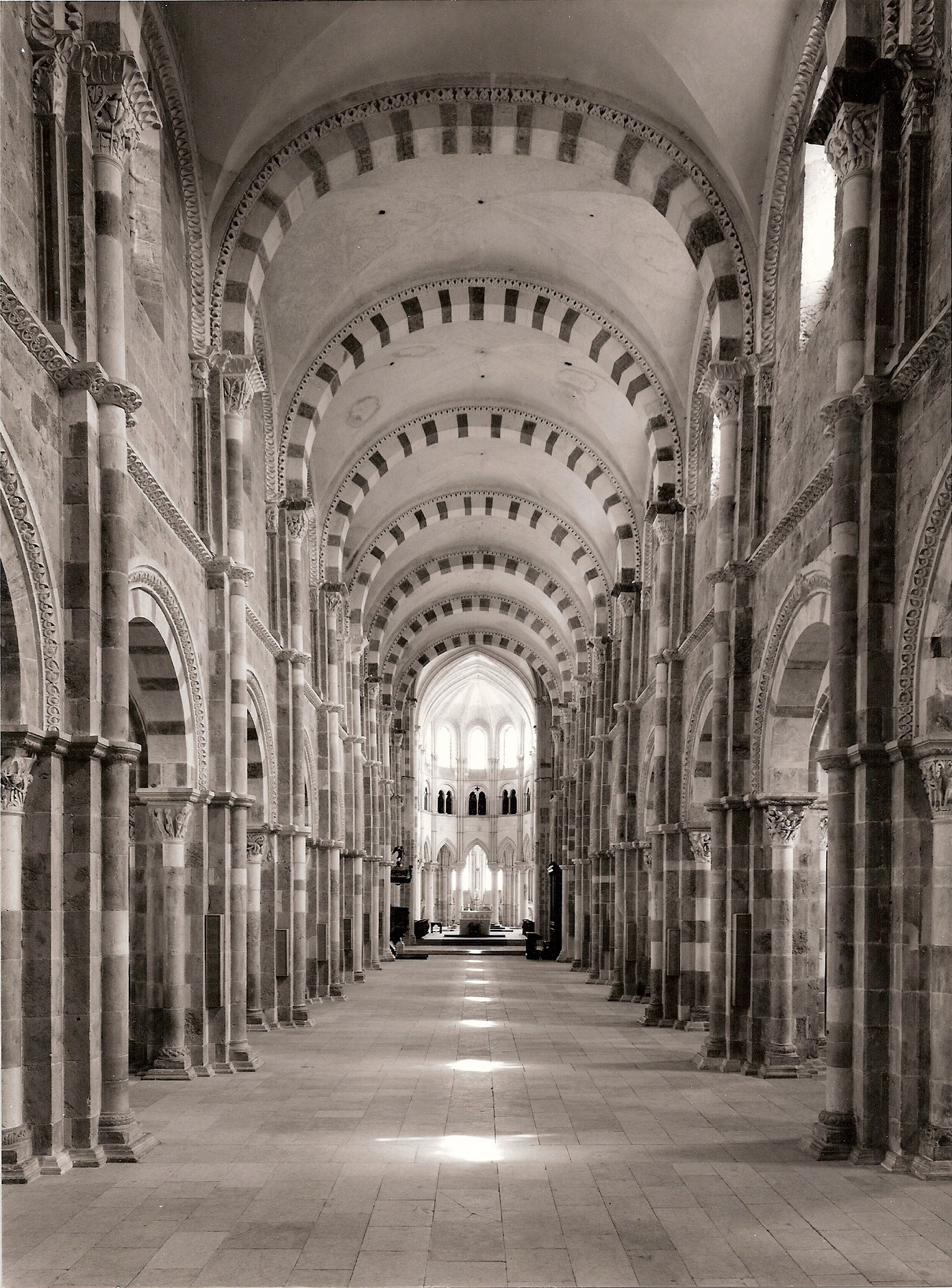
Nave of basilica at Vézelay Abbey

- 1100 – Gloucester Cathedral dedicated as a new Gloucester Abbey church in England, but seriously damaged by a fire in the city in 1102.
- 1102
  - Old Cathedral, Salamanca founded.
  - Tewkesbury Abbey in England begun.
- 1104 – New basilica at Vézelay Abbey in France dedicated.
- 1105 – The Romanesque Bayeux Cathedral is partially destroyed by a fire, marking the beginning of Gothic style reconstructions.
- 1106 – Rebuilt Speyer Cathedral completed.
- 1106–1108 – Gate Church of the Trinity (Pechersk Lavra) in Kiev built.
- 1107
  - Basilica of Saint-Martin d'Ainay, Lyon consecrated.
  - San Savino, Piacenza, rebuilt.
- 1108 – Southwell Minster in England begun.

== Events ==
- 1103 – Chinese architect and government minister Li Jie publishes his Yingzao Fashi, a technical treatise on Chinese architecture during the reign of Emperor Huizong of Song.

== Deaths ==
- 1110 – Li Jie, Chinese architect (born 1065)
