= Mathilde Alanic =

French writer

Mathilde Allanic
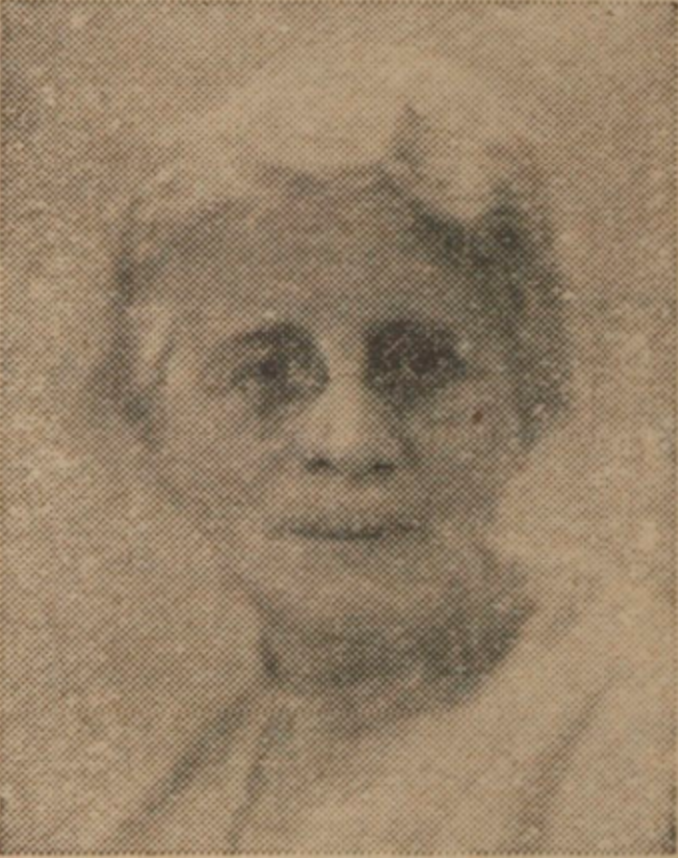
- Photograph by Henri Manuel.
- Born: 10 November 1864; Angers (Maine-et-Loire), France
- Died: 20 October 1948 (aged 83); Angers, Maine-et-Loire, France
- Education: Ecole Supérieure des Lettres, Angers
- Occupation: writer
- Writing career
- Pen name: "Miranda"
- Language: French
- Genres: sentimental novels; short stories
- Notable works: Ma Cousine Nicole; Le mariage de Hoche; Les roses refleurissent
- Notable awards: Montyon prize; Jules-Favre prize; Sobrier-Arnould prize; Chevalier, Legion of Honour

Signature
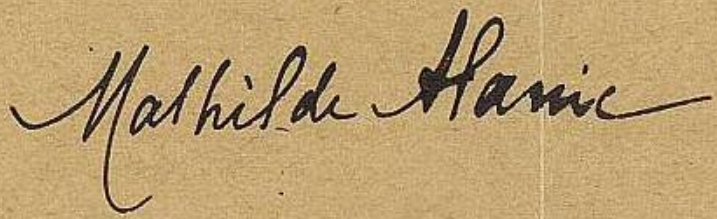

Mathilde Alanic (pen name, Miranda; 10 November 1864 – 20 October 1948) was a French writer of sentimental novels and short stories. Her work appeared in Les Annales politiques et littéraires, L'Eventail, Le Magasin pittoresque, Musée des familles, Le National illustré, La Petite Illustration, Le Petit Journal, Le Petit Parisien, Revue de l'Anjou, and other journals. Alanic was a recipient of the Montyon prize, Jules-Favre prize, Sobrier-Arnould prize, and was promoted Chevalier, Legion of Honour. She died in 1948.

== Early life and education ==
Mathilde Alanic was born 10 November 1864, in Angers (Maine-et-Loire). Her father, Julien Louis Alanic, was an entrepreneur and a Breton house painter from the faubourg Bressigny, in Angers. Her mother was Mathilde Louise (Verdun) Alanic.

Alanic attended a Catholic boarding school before becoming a pupil of Henri Bergson at the Ecole Supérieure des Lettres in Angers. She wrote a romantic Spanish "novel" for her family's entertainment at the age of nine, versified correspondence to her friends at the age of 11, then short stories under the pseudonym of "Miranda", in the Revue de l'Anjou, L'Eventail, and Parisian reviews, which got her noticed.

== Career ==
The Christmas tale, "La soutane de l'abbé Constantin", came out in 1897, and was followed by "Norbert Dys". Her first novel, Le Maître du Moulin Blanc, appeared in La Petite Illustration in 1898. She then wrote about thirty mainly sentimental novels, but also wrote many short stories like "Marianik" in 1899.

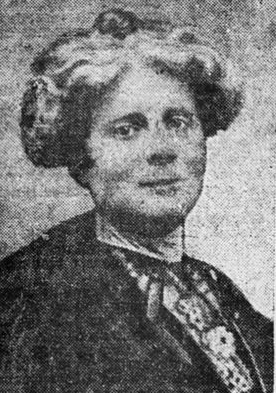
1929

She published Maître du Moulin Blanc in 1901. In the same year, she began her Nicole series, Ma cousine Nicole, which ran through 1939. It followed the life of a young girl, through her marriage (1920), motherhood (1921) and being a grandmother (1929). she became a member of the Société des gens de lettres de France (SGDLF) in 1904. Between 1906 and 1923, she collaborated on three novels with Henri Gautier.

In addition to Bergson, she received encouragement and inspiration from André Bellessort, René Boylesve, Adolphe Brisson, Alberic Cahuet, François Coppée, Camille Flammarion, Ernest Flammarion, Georges Lecomte, and Albert Sorel. Her works were appreciated outside France, especially in Belgium and Switzerland. Her works were presented as "classic reading" in schools in England and Germany.

== Awards and honours ==
In 1903, she received the Montyon prize from the Académie Française for her work Ma Cousine Nicole as well as in 1929 for Le mariage de Hoche. In 1913, she received the Jules-Favre prize from the French Academy for her work Petite miette. In 1920, she received the Sobrier-Arnould prize also awarded by the Académie Française for Les roses refleurissent. On 3 February 1929, she was promoted Chevalier, Legion of Honour on the recommendation of the Minister of Public Instruction and Fine Arts, for her 35-year literary career.

== Death and legacy ==
Mathilde Alanic died 20 October 1948 (aged 84) in the city of her birth.

Streets in Angers and in Saint-Sylvain-d'Anjou are named in her honor.

== Selected works ==
Aime et tu renaitras

L'essor des colombes

Le devoir du fils

- Norbert Dys, 1899
- Le Maître du Moulin-Blanc, 1902
- Ma cousine Nicole, 1902
- Mie Jacqueline, 1903
- Les Espérances, 1906
- Le devoir d'un fils, 1906
- La Gloire de Fonteclaire, 1907
- La romance de Joconde, 1908
- Aime et tu renaîtras, 1908
- La fille de la sirène, 1909
- Les Espérances, Collection Stella, no. 4
- L'oiseau couleur du temps
- Francine chez les gens de rien
- Monette, Collection Stella, no. 56
- La Petite Miette, 1911
- La Petite Guignolette
- Et L'amour dispose, 1911
- Le soleil couchant, 1913
- Les roses refleurissent, Plon 1919
- Nicole mariée, 1920
- Nicole Maman, 1921
- Aimes et tu renaitras, 1921
- Le Sachet de lavande, 1924
- L'aube du cœur, 1925
- Le Mariage de Hoche, 1928
- Les Loups Sur La Lande, 1928
- Anne et le Bonheur, 1930
- Étoiles dans la nuit, 1932
- Les Danaïdes, 1934
- Les remous du passés,1935
- Féli, 1936
- Nicole et les temps nouveaux, 1939
- Le fuseau d'or, 1941
- La Cinquième Jeunesse de Mme Ermance, 1944
