= 1742 in architecture =

The year 1742 in architecture involved some significant events.

== Buildings and structures ==
=== Buildings ===
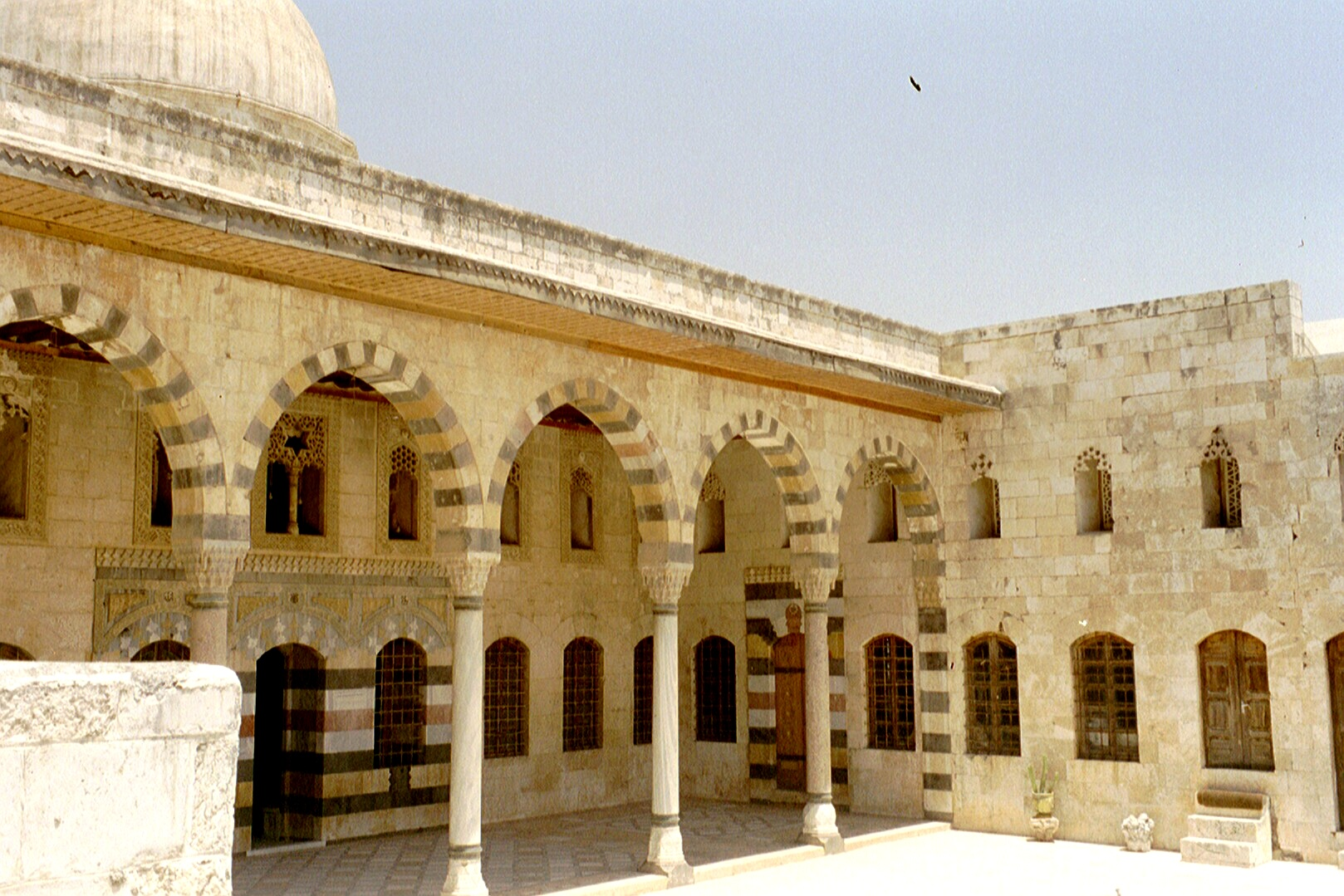
Azm Palace (Hama)

- Azm Palace (Hama), Syria, built.
- Hôtel de Caumont, Aix-en-Provence, designed by Robert de Cotte (d.1735) and Georges Vallon, completed.
- Kozłówka Palace, Poland, designed by Józef Fontana II, completed.
- Palace of Portici, Italy, designed by Antonio Canevari, completed.
- Palais Rohan, Strasbourg, Alsace, designed by Robert de Cotte, completed.
- Malplaquet House, east London, England, built.
- Berlin Court Opera, designed by Georg Wenzeslaus von Knobelsdorff, inaugurated.
- Queen Mary Court at Greenwich Hospital, London, planned by Wren (d.1723) and Hawksmoor (d.1736), completed by Thomas Ripley.
- Redland Chapel, Bristol, England, designed probably by John Strahan or William Halfpenny, built.

== Publications ==
- Batty Langley publishes Ancient Architecture Restored in England, a pioneering pattern book for Gothic Revival architecture.

== Births ==
- March 13 – Karl Friedrich Schinkel, Prussian architect (died 1841)

== Deaths ==
- June 29 – Joseph Emanuel Fischer von Erlach, Austrian architect (born 1693)
