= Chestnut Trees and Farm at Jas de Bouffan =

Chestnut Trees and Farm at Jas de Bouffan may refer to:

- Chestnut Trees and Farm at Jas de Bouffan (Cézanne, Moscow)
- Chestnut Trees and Farm at Jas de Bouffan (Cézanne, Pasadena)
