= Hôtel d'Esmivy de Moissac =

Coordinates: 43.5263°N 5.4464°E

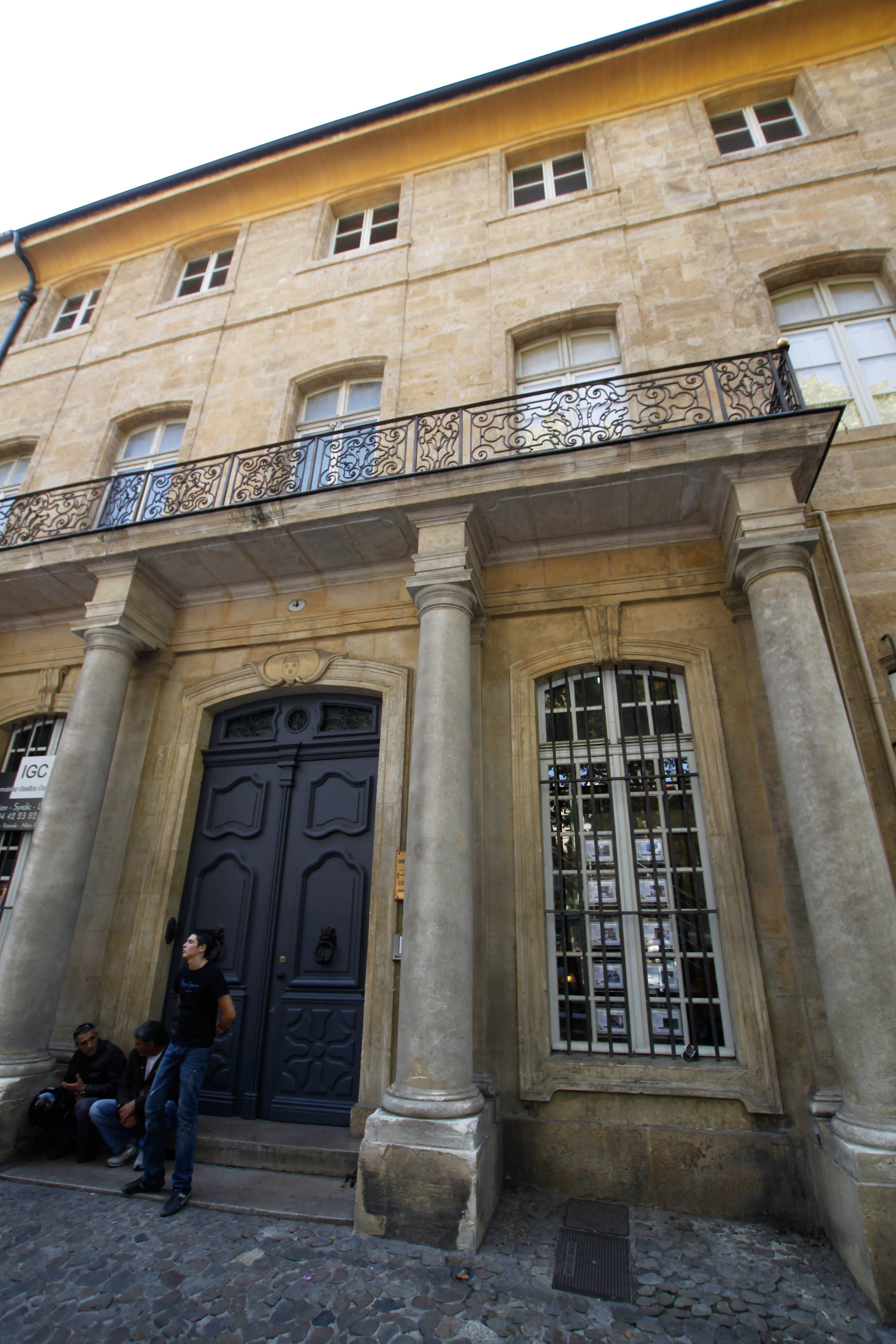
- Interactive map of the Hôtel d'Esmivy de Moissac area

General information
- Type: Hôtel particulier
- Location: 4, Cours Mirabeau, Aix-en-Provence, France
- Construction started: 1710
- Completed: 1757

Design and construction
- Architect: Georges Vallon

The Hôtel d'Esmivy de Moissac (a.k.a. Hôtel de Villars) is a listed hôtel particulier in Aix-en-Provence, Bouches-du-Rhône, France.

== Location ==
It is located on the corner of the Cours Mirabeau and the Avenue Victor Hugo, in the centre of Aix-en-Provence. Its exact address is 4, Cours Mirabeau.

== History ==
Construction began in 1710. In 1757, its facade was designed by French architect Georges Vallon (1688-1767), who designed many other buildings in Aix, including the Hôtel du Poët at the top of the Cours Mirabeau.

The hotel is three-story high. Its facade has two Doric columns supporting the balcony overlooking the Cours Mirabeau on the first floor. Inside, there is a grand staircase with a wrought-iron railing. On the ceilings, there is ornamental plasterwork representing angels.

Its original owner was Lois d'Esmivy de Moissac, an Advisor to the "Cours des Comptes". In 1750, de Moissac's grandson sold it to Honoré Armand de Villars (1702-1770).

== Heritage significance ==
It has been listed as a "monument historique" since January 5, 1993.
