= Chestnut Trees and Farm at Jas de Bouffan (Cézanne, Pasadena) =

Painting by Paul Cézanne

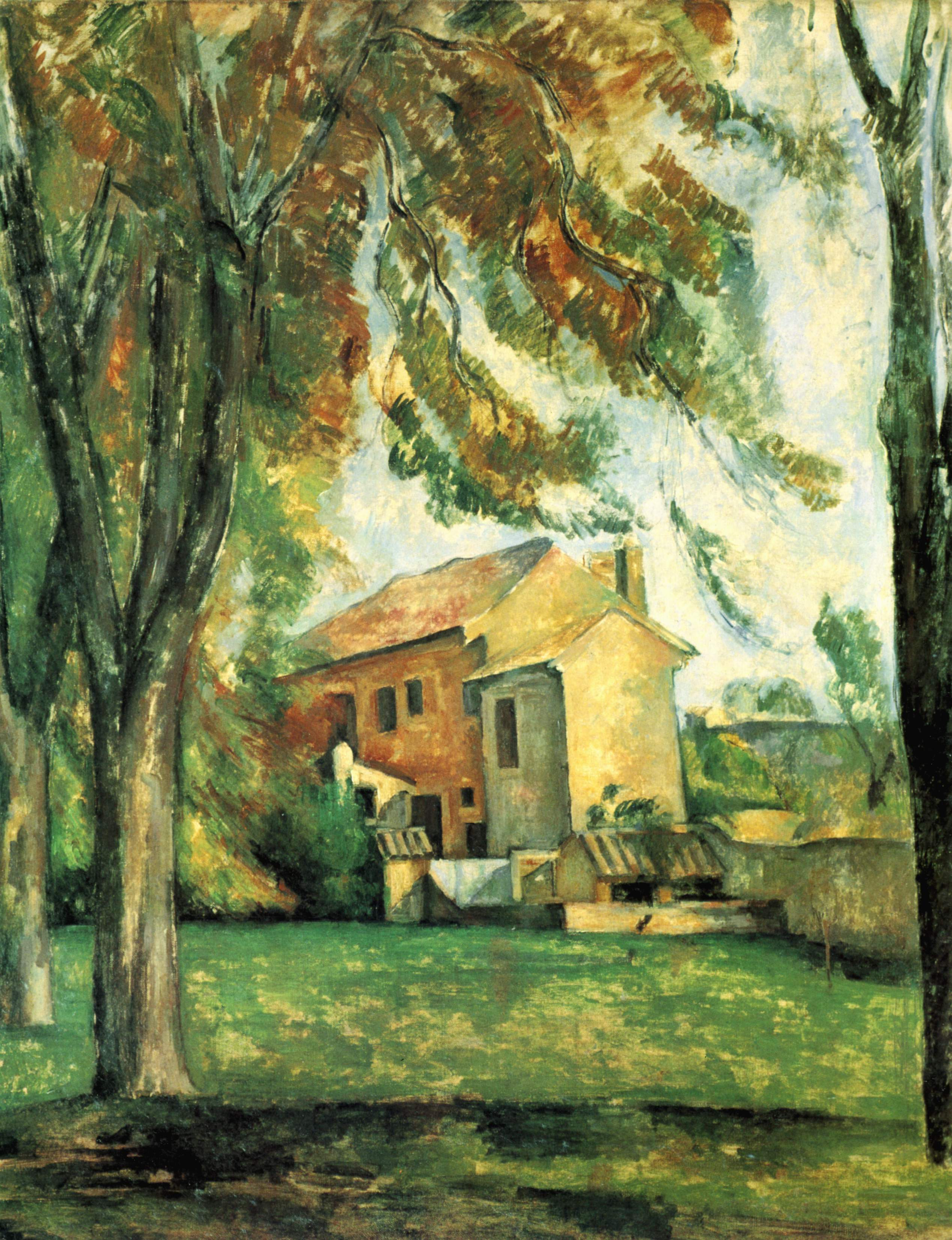
- Artist: Paul Cézanne
- Year: 1884년경
- Medium: oil on canvas
- Dimensions: 91.9 cm × 72.9 cm (36.2 in × 28.7 in)
- Location: Norton Simon Museum, Pasadena

Chestnut Trees and Farm at Jas de Bouffan is an oil on canvas painting by the French Post-Impressionist artist Paul Cézanne, created c. 1884. It is held in the Norton Simon Museum, in Pasadena.

== Description ==
This painting depicts the farmhouse on Cézanne’s family estate near Aix-en-Provence, the bastide known as Le Jas de Bouffan. The farmhouse is situated in the immediate vicinity of the family’s bastide. Cézanne painted it as a gift for one of his servants. He plays with the contrast between the geometric volumes of the farmhouse and the autumn foliage of the chestnut trees.

== See also ==
- List of paintings by Paul Cézanne
