= Hôtel du Poët =

Coordinates: 43.5271°N 5.4516°E

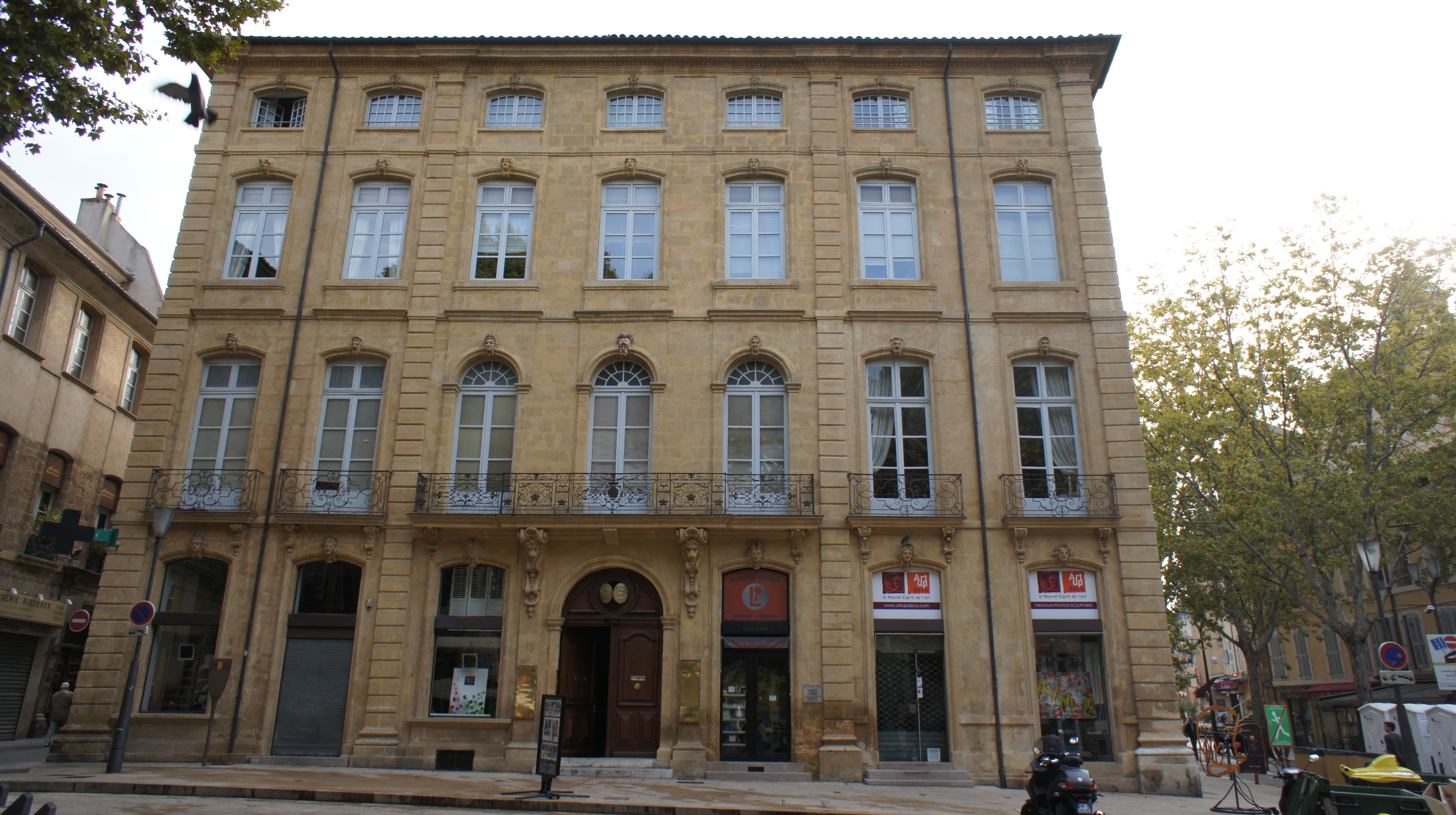
- Interactive map of the Hôtel du Poët area

General information
- Type: Hôtel particulier
- Location: Cours Mirabeau, Aix-en-Provence, France
- Completed: 1730
- Client: Henri Gautier

Design and construction
- Architect: Georges Vallon

The Hôtel du Poët is a listed hôtel particulier in Aix-en-Provence.

== Location ==
It is located on the Place Forbin at the top of the Cours Mirabeau in Aix-en-Provence.

== History ==
In 1730, Henri Gautier (1676-1757) purchased some land at the top of the Cours Mirabeau, where there was an old watermill. He commissioned architect Georges Vallon (1688-1767) to design a hôtel particulier: the Hôtel du Poët. Later, it was home to a chemist and a printing press.

It is an example of baroque architecture. The facade has mascarons. Inside, the main staircase has columns, and Louis XVI handrails with the Poët escutcheons.

== Heritage significance ==
It has been listed as a "monument historique" since 3 November 1987.
