= La Petite Illustration =

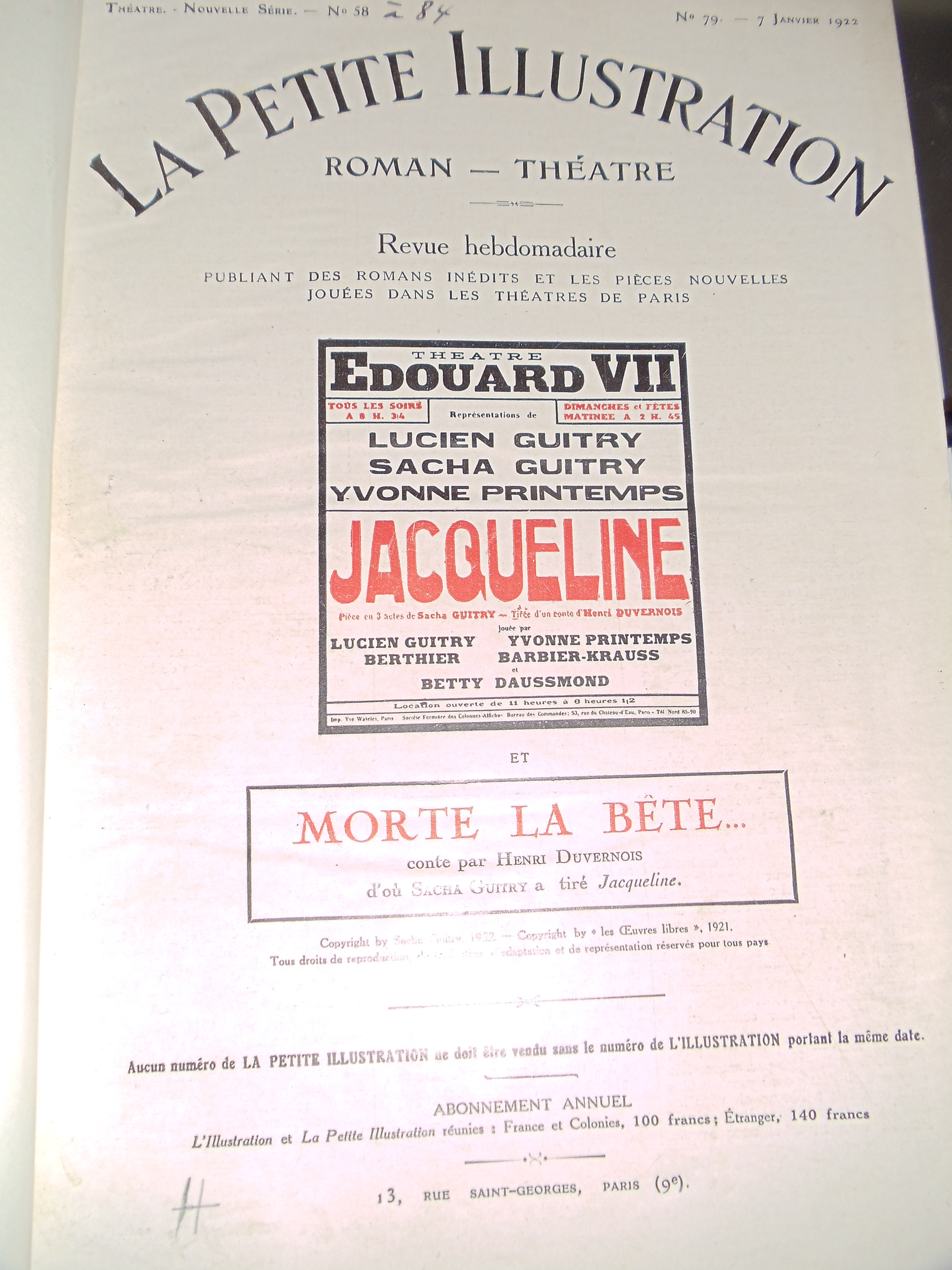
Issue 79, 7 January 1922

La Petite Illustration was a weekly French literary journal. Being a supplement to L'Illustration it existed between 1913 and 26 August 1939.

== History and profile ==
La Petite Illustration was founded in 1913. It was a newspaper supplement to L'Illustration and published plays, novels and short stories often first publishing and containing illustrations. The headquarters of the magazine was in Paris.

The magazine has been noted that it published works on French Algeria. It also covered articles on theatre.

Contributors included Marcel Pagnol and Isabelle Sandy, among others.

La Petite Illustration ceased publication on 26 August 1939. It was replaced by another theatrical journal, L'avant-scène théâtre.
