= Bastide du Jas de Bouffan =

Historic bastide in Aix-en-Provence, France

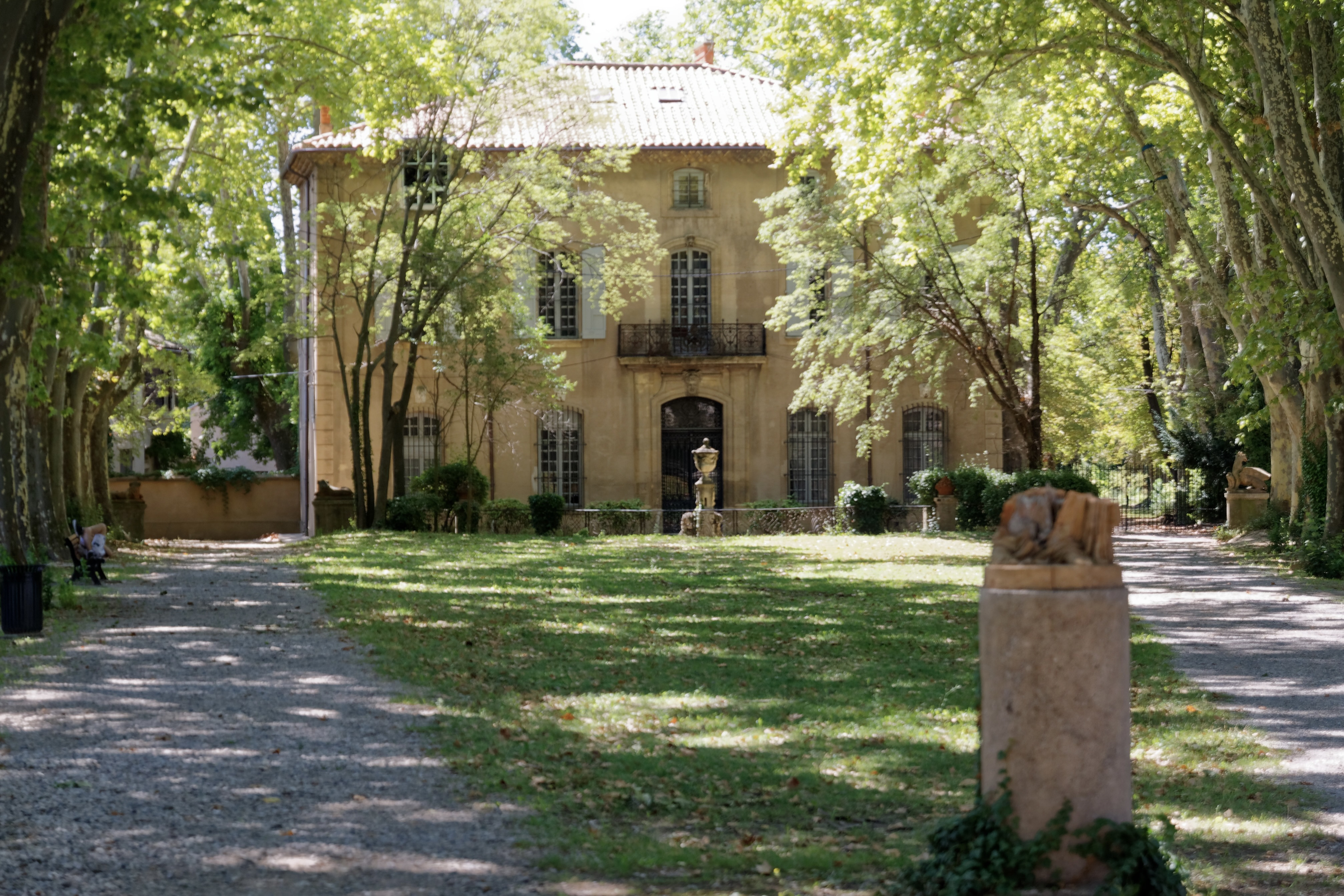

General information
- Coordinates: 43.527°N 5.429°E

Design and construction
- Architect: Georges Vallon

The Bastide du Jas de Bouffan (Granel-Corsy du Jas de Bouffan) is a historic bastide house museum dedicated to painter Paul Cézanne, in Aix-en-Provence, France.

== Location ==
The bastide is located at 17 route de Galice in Jas de Bouffan, a neighbourhood of Aix-en-Provence.

== History ==
The manor house was built circa 1750 for Gaspard Truphème, an advisor to the Court of Audits. He hired architect Georges Vallon, who designed many other historic buildings in the centre of Aix. The bastide is surrounded by a private garden with ponds, fountains and sculptures. It was inherited by Gaspard's son, Pierre, followed by his grandson, Joseph, whose daughter Gabrielle passed it to her son, Gabriel Joursin in 1854.

The bastide was purchased by banker Louis-Auguste Cézanne, the father of famed painter Paul Cézanne, in 1859. In 1880, Paul Cézanne established an atelier in the attic. He also painted the walls of the living-room. Additionally, he often painted in the garden, looking out to the Montagne Sainte-Victoire from different vantage points. After his father's death, he lived in the bastide with his mother.

The bastide was acquired by Louis Granel, an engineer, in 1899. His daughter married Frédéric Corsy, an anatomist. His son, André Corsy, lived there with his wife, Nina Wakhévitch, and their adopted children until his death in 2002.

== Cézanne museum ==
The bastide was acquired by the municipality of Aix-en-Provence in the 2000s for restoration and for the inauguration of a Cézanne Museum in 2006. This took place during the "Year of Cézanne in Provence", commemorating the centenary of Cézanne's death, with the aim of showcasing the bastide, its gardens, and the painter's life. Since 2006, it may be visited by tourists, by appointment only.

The bastide was closed in 2018 for an extensive restoration. Initially, it underwent an architectural renovation coordinated by chief architect of historic monuments Pierre-Antoine Gatier, which was completed in 2020. However, work continued to restore the park to its original appearance, as depicted in Cézanne's paintings, and to construct additional buildings, primarily for the ticket office. The bastide reopened to the public in June 2025.

== Architectural significance ==
It has been listed as an official historical monument by the French Ministry of Culture since 2001.
