= Hôtel de Caumont =

French hotel

Coordinates: 43.5257°N 5.4488°E

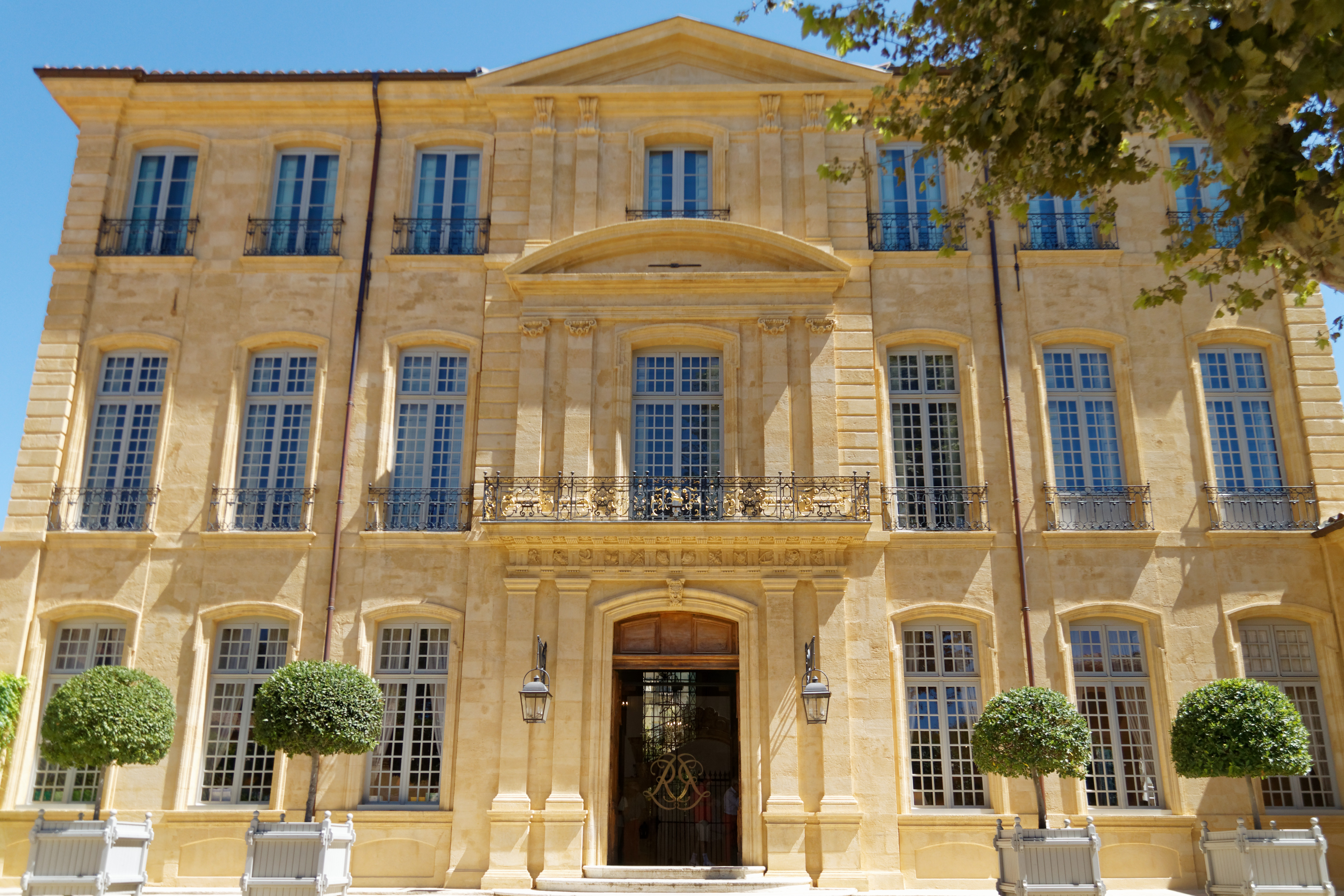
- Facade of the Hôtel de Caumont
- Interactive map of the Hôtel de Caumont area

General information
- Type: Hôtel particulier
- Location: 1 rue Joseph Cabassol, Aix-en-Provence, France
- Completed: 1742

Design and construction
- Architect: Georges Vallon

The Hôtel de Caumont is a listed hôtel particulier in Aix-en-Provence in France.

== Location ==
It is located at 1 rue Joseph Cabassol, in the Quartier Mazarin of Aix-en-Provence.

== History ==
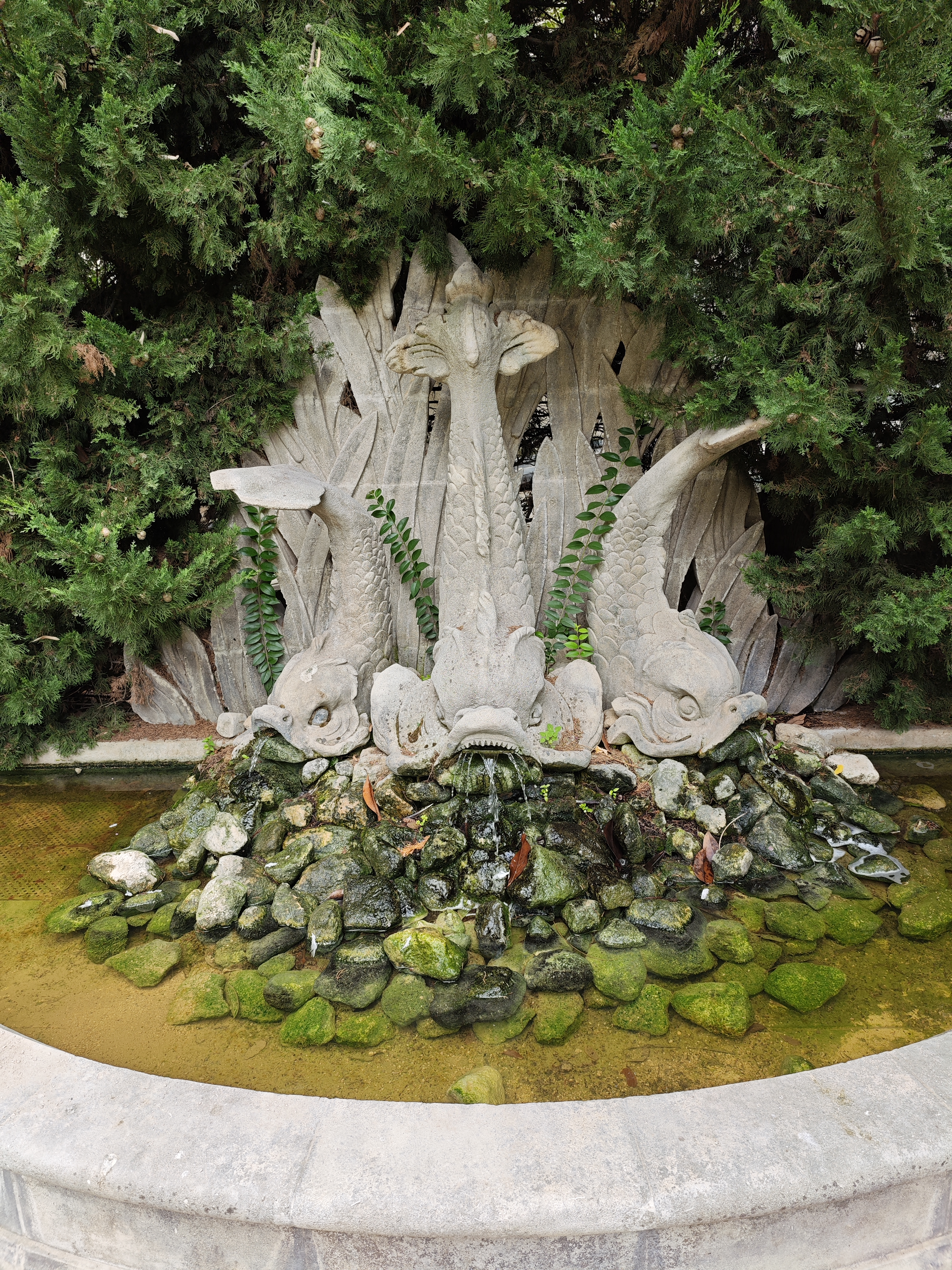
Decorative stone fountain at Hôtel de Caumont, Aix-en-Provence

It was designed by architects Robert de Cotte (1656–1735) and Georges Vallon (1688-1767), and built from 1715 to 1742 for François Rolland de Réauville de Tertulle, the Marquess of Cabannes. Sculptors Jean-Baptiste Rambot and Bernard Toro designed the atlas. Inside, the entrance has an indoor fountain, with two sets of stairs: one for the family, and another one for the staff.

The hotel was inherited by Jean-Baptiste-François de Tertulle, son of François Rolland de Réauville de Tertulle. Upon his death, his widow sold it to François de Bruny de la Tour d'Aigues (1690-1772). It was inherited by his son, the Marseilles shipowner Jean-Baptiste de Bruny de la Tour d'Aigues (1724-1794), who served as the Président à mortier of the Parlement of Aix-en-Provence. He bequeathed it on to his son Marie Jean Joseph (1768-1800), who again passed it to his sister, Pauline de Bruny de la Tour d'Aigues (1767-1850), who had married Amable-Victor-Joseph-François de Paule de Seytres de Caumont (1764-1841), the Marquess of Caumont, in 1796. He was accused of "stealing the most beautiful hôtel particulier from Provence by this marriage," as a street sign outside the hotel suggests. The marriage was childless, and the hotel was bequeathed to one of Pauline's cousins.

In 1964, General Isembart sold it to the city of Aix. They rented it out to La Poste, the postal service in France. From 1970 to 2013, it was home to a music school, the Conservatoire Darius Milhaud.

It has been listed as a monument historique since 1990.

== At present ==
Hôtel de Caumont was purchased in 2013 by Culturespaces for €10 million. Over the next two years it underwent extensive refurbishing, and reopened to the public on May 6, 2015, as a paid attraction and cultural space, exhibiting sections of the house and garden as they were in their prime, along with a gift shop, art exhibition space, and a small theater.

== Gallery ==
Hôtel de Caumont
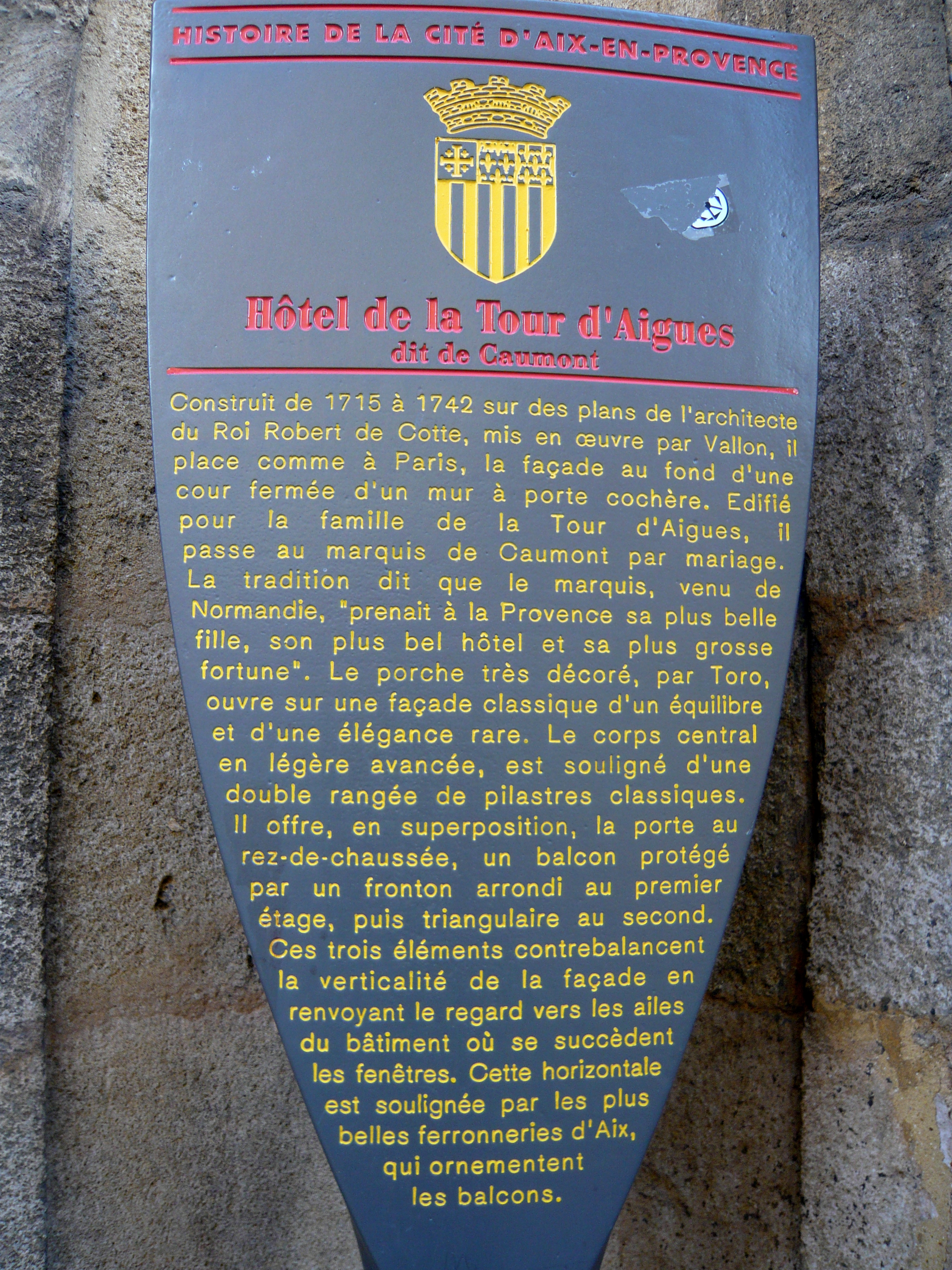
Street sign about the history of the Hôtel de Caumont

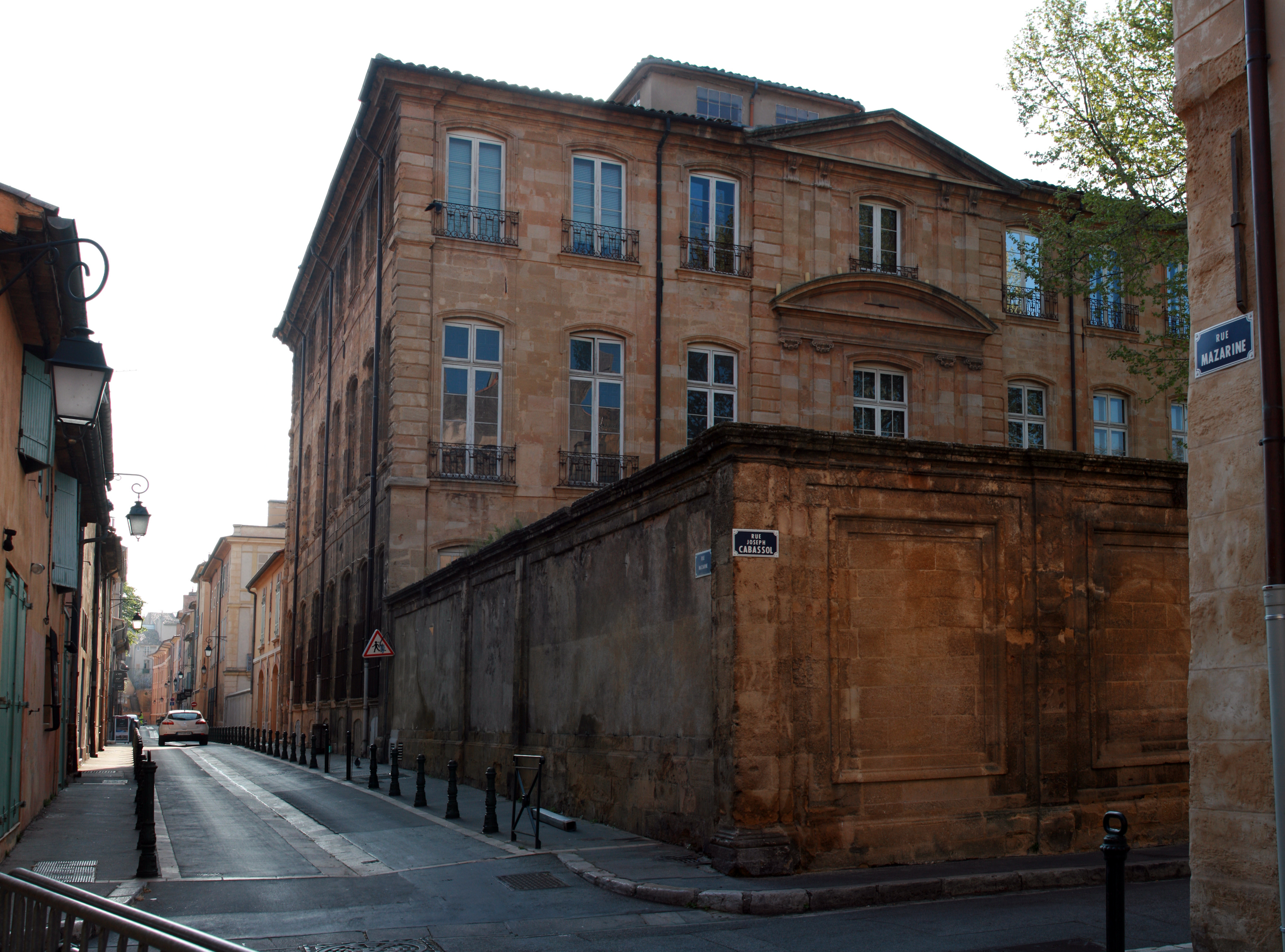
Hôtel de Caumont seen from the corner of the rue Mazarine and the rue Cabassol

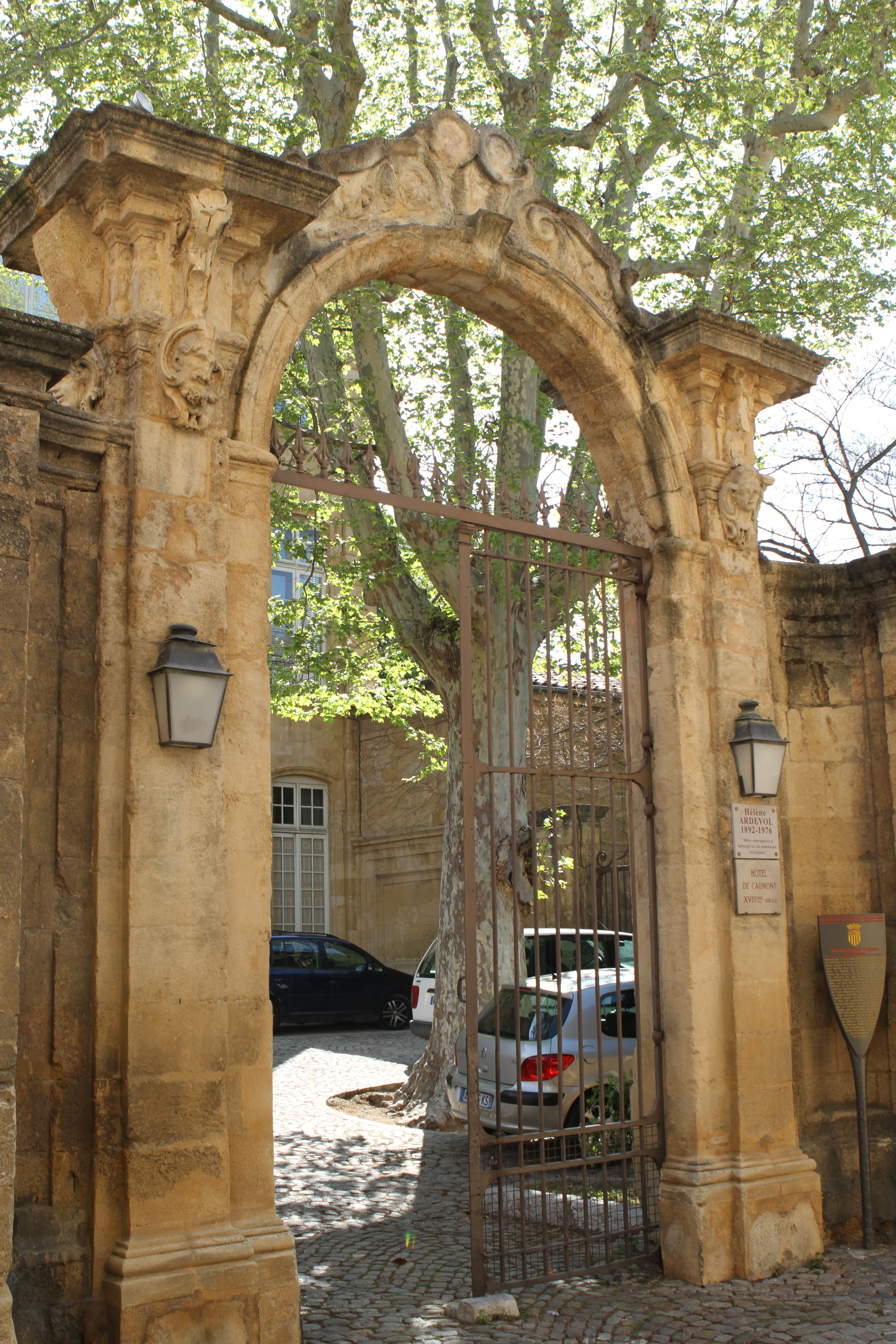
Main door to the courtyard

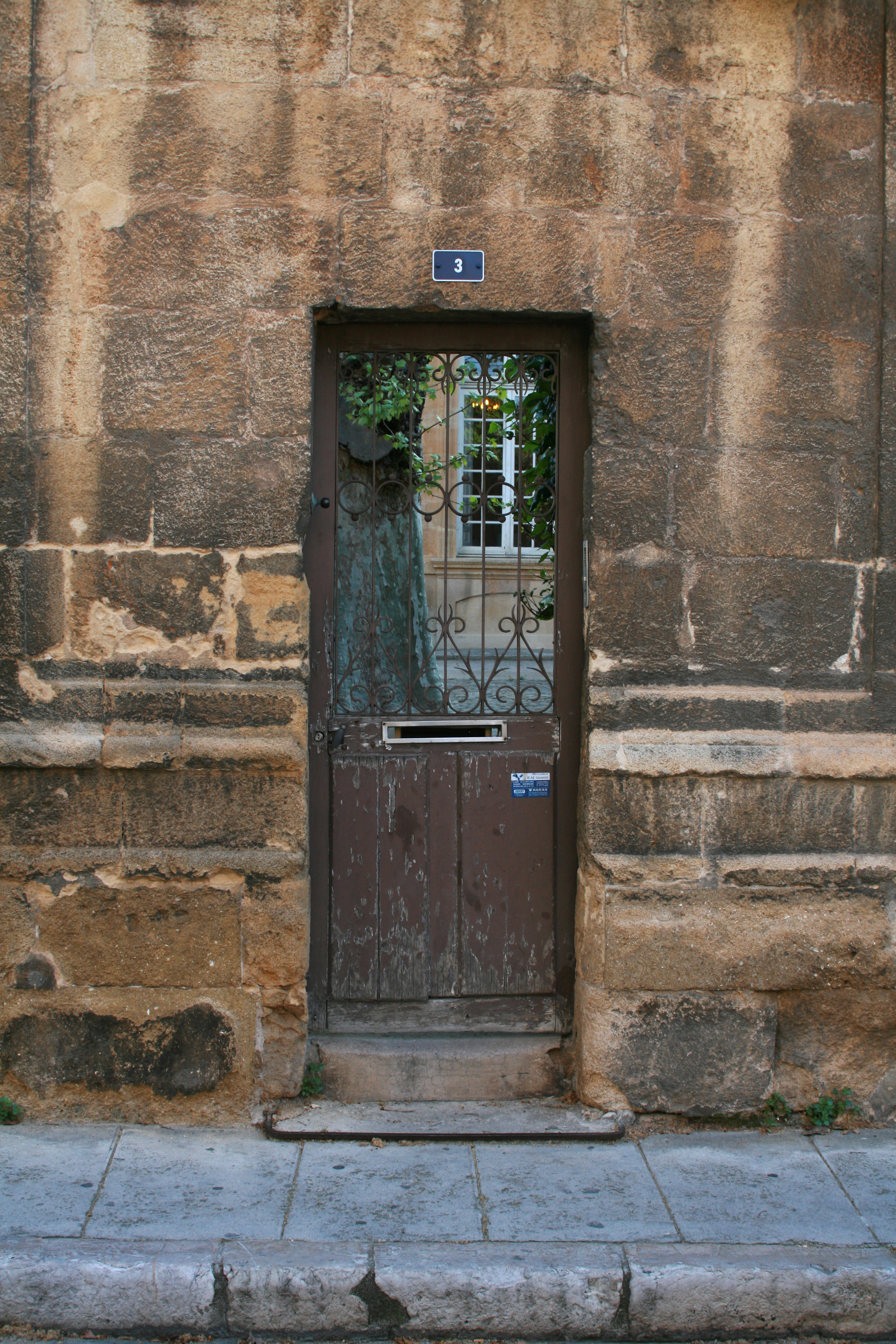
Side door to the courtyard

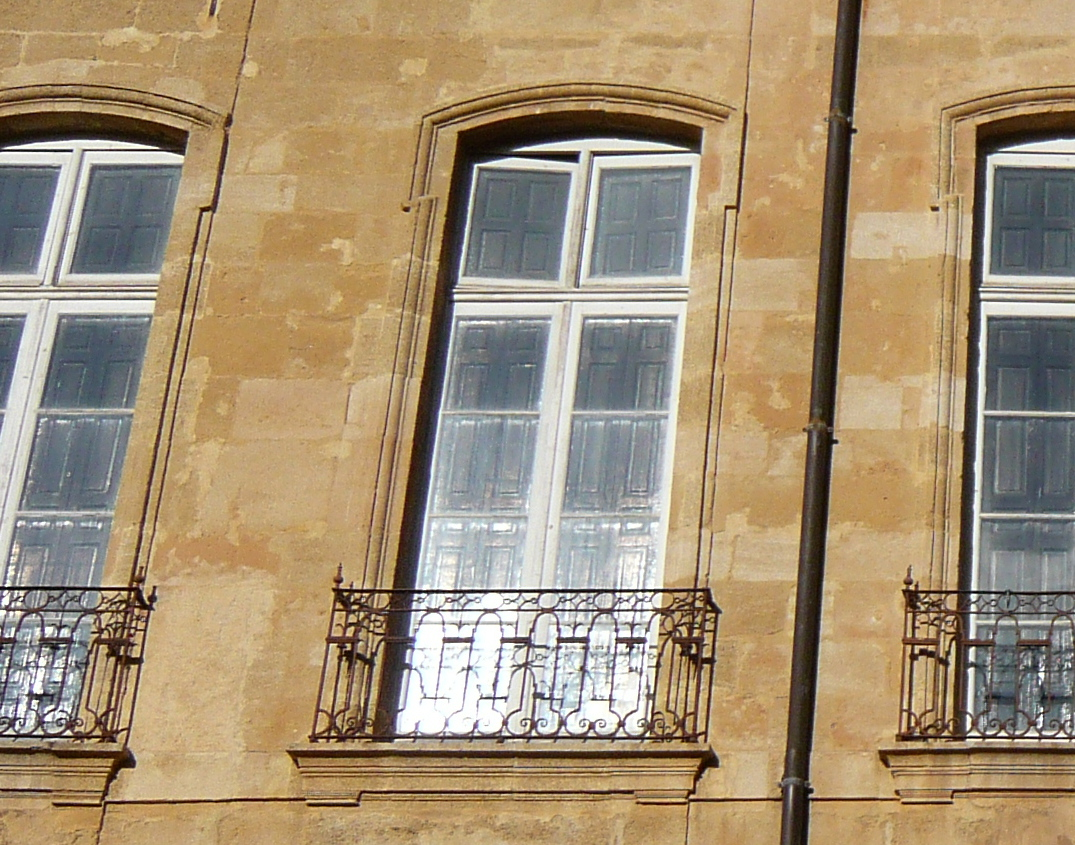
Balcony

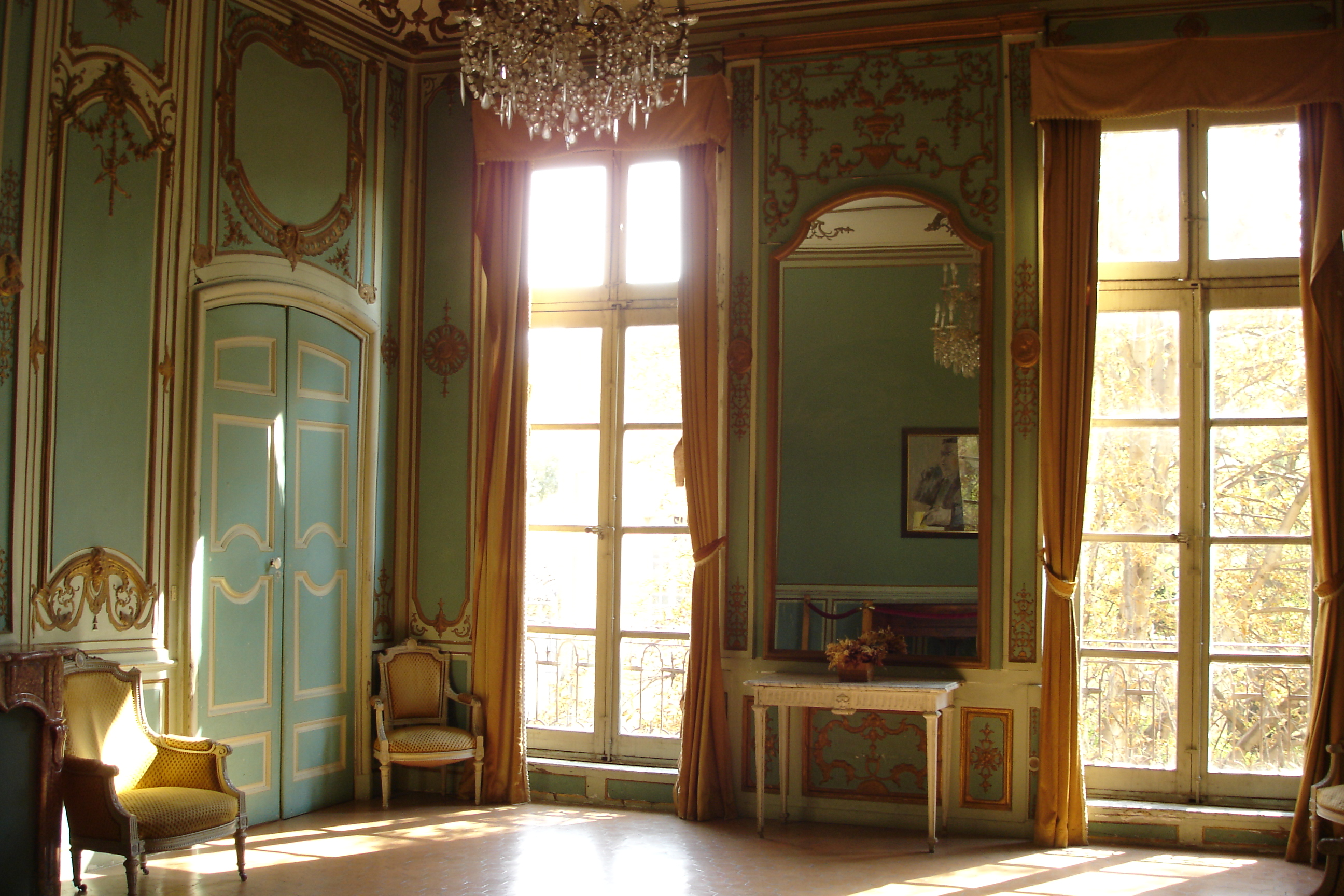
Drawing room inside the Hôtel de Caumont

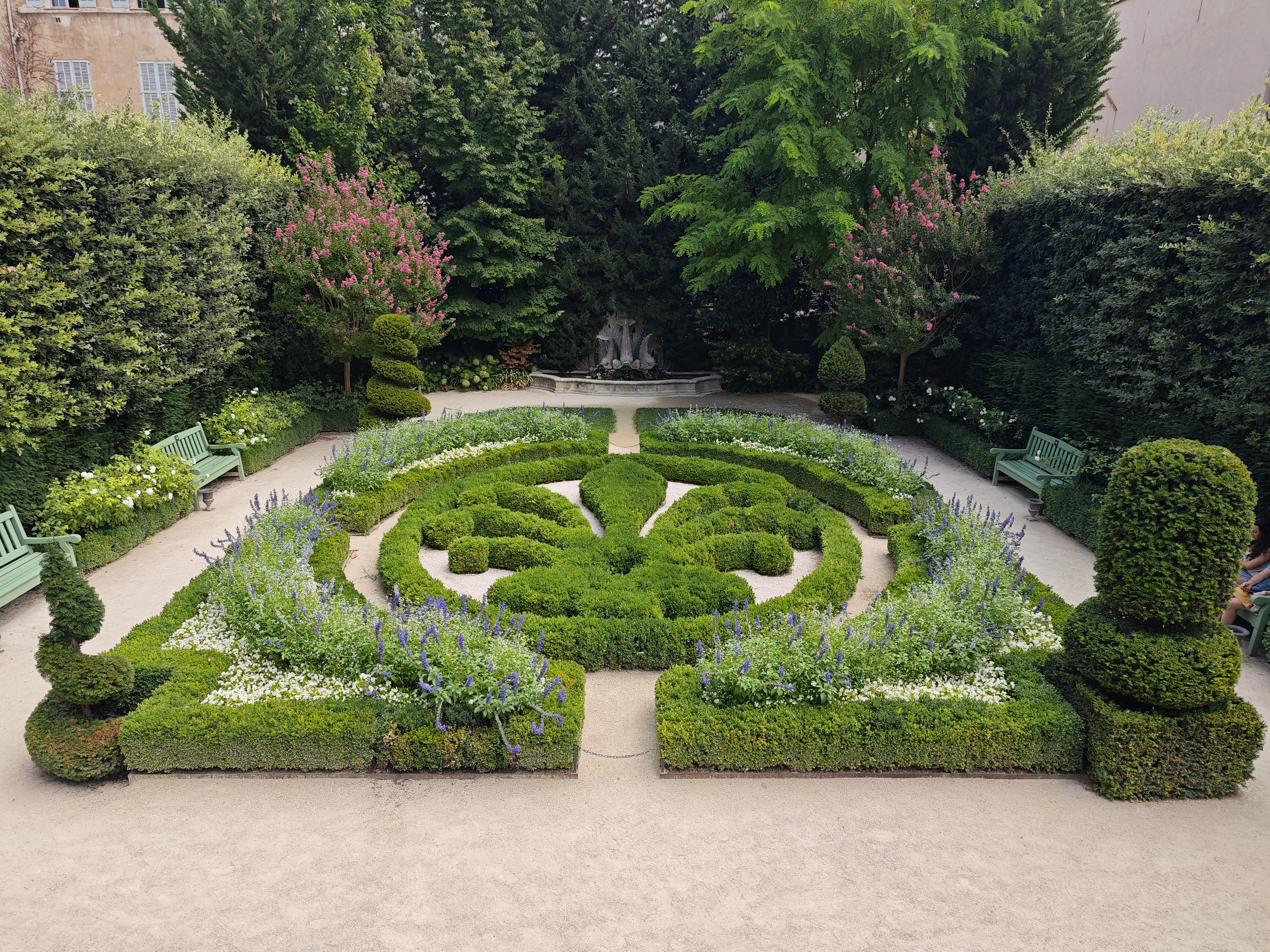
