= Georges Vallon =

French architect

- Born: 26 December 1688
- Died: 7 November 1767 (aged 78)
- Occupation: Architect
- Parent: Laurent Vallon

Georges Vallon (1688–1767) was a French architect. Many of his buildings are listed as "monuments historiques".

== Biography ==
=== Early life ===
Georges Vallon was born in 1688. His father, Laurent Vallon (1652–1724), was a renowned architect. He was trained in Languedoc, Lyon and Paris.

=== Career ===
Like his father, he became a renowned architect.

In Aix-en-Provence, he was commissioned by Jean-Baptiste d'Albertas (1716–1790) to design the Place d'Albertas, which has been listed since 2000. Additionally, he designed the Palais de l'université located on the Place de l'Université on the Rue Gaston de Saporta opposite the Cathédrale Saint-Sauveur in 1734, which formerly housed the law school and now houses Sciences Po Aix. It has been listed since 1929.

He also designed several buildings on the Cours Mirabeau in Aix. For example, in 1730, he designed the Hôtel du Poët for Henri Gautier (1676–1757), located at the very top of the Cours, and listed since 1987. Moreover, in 1757, he designed the facade of the Hôtel d'Esmivy de Moissac at the bottom of the Cours, listed since 1993.

Together with Robert de Cotte (1656–1735) and Jean Aubert (1680–1741), he also designed an hôtel particulier called the Hôtel de Caumont, also listed.

With his father, he also designed the Halle aux grains, another listed building since 1983, which was built from 1717 to 1759 and now houses a post office and a library.

Vallon designed the Bastide du Jas de Bouffan on the outskirts of Aix for Gaspard Truphème circa 1750. It was acquired by Louis-Auguste Cézanne in 1859, where his son, painter Paul Cézanne, lived until 1899. It has been listed since 1980.

=== Death ===
He died in 1767.

== Gallery ==
Buildings designed by Georges Vallon
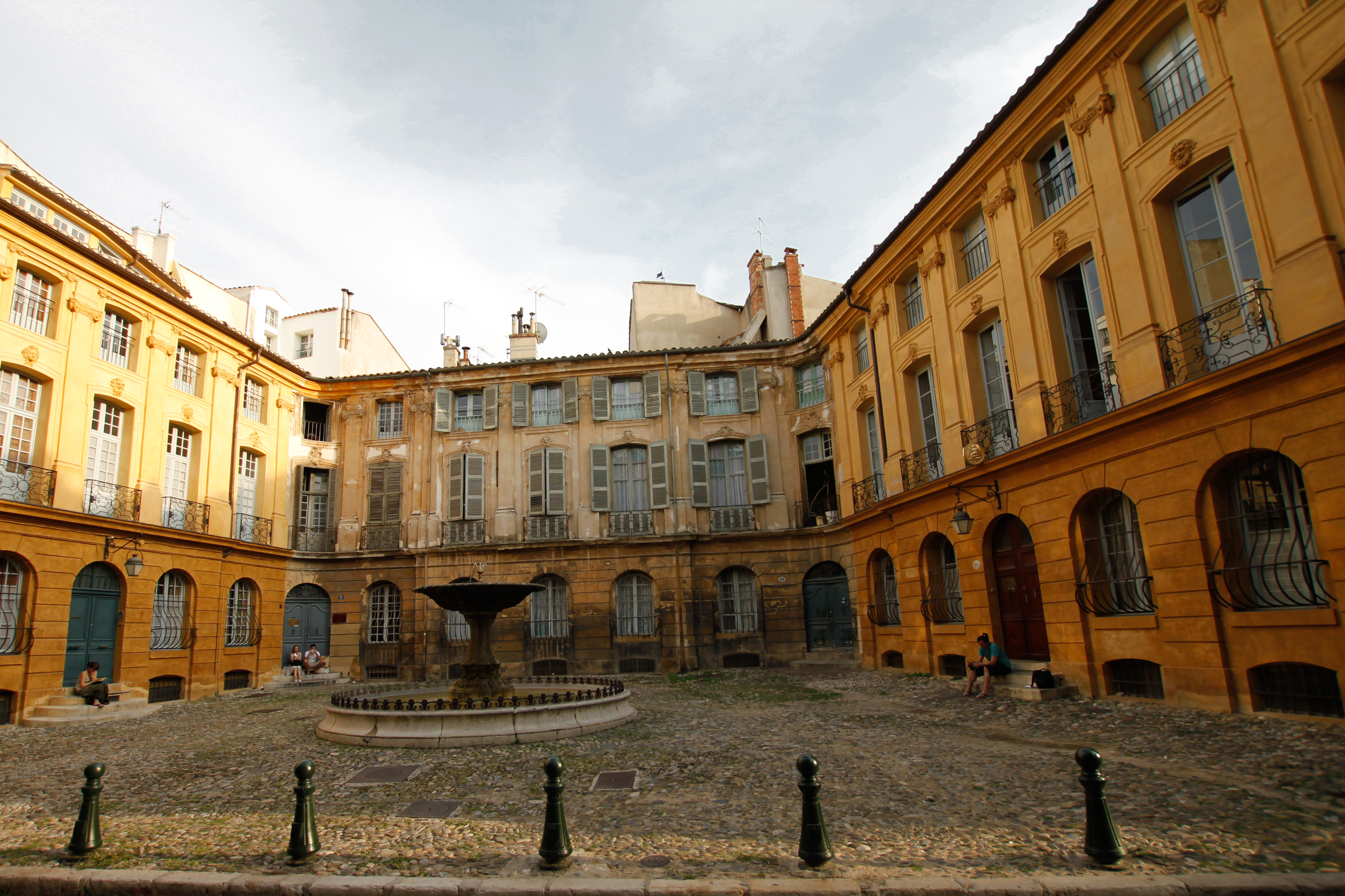
Place d'Albertas in Aix-en-Provence

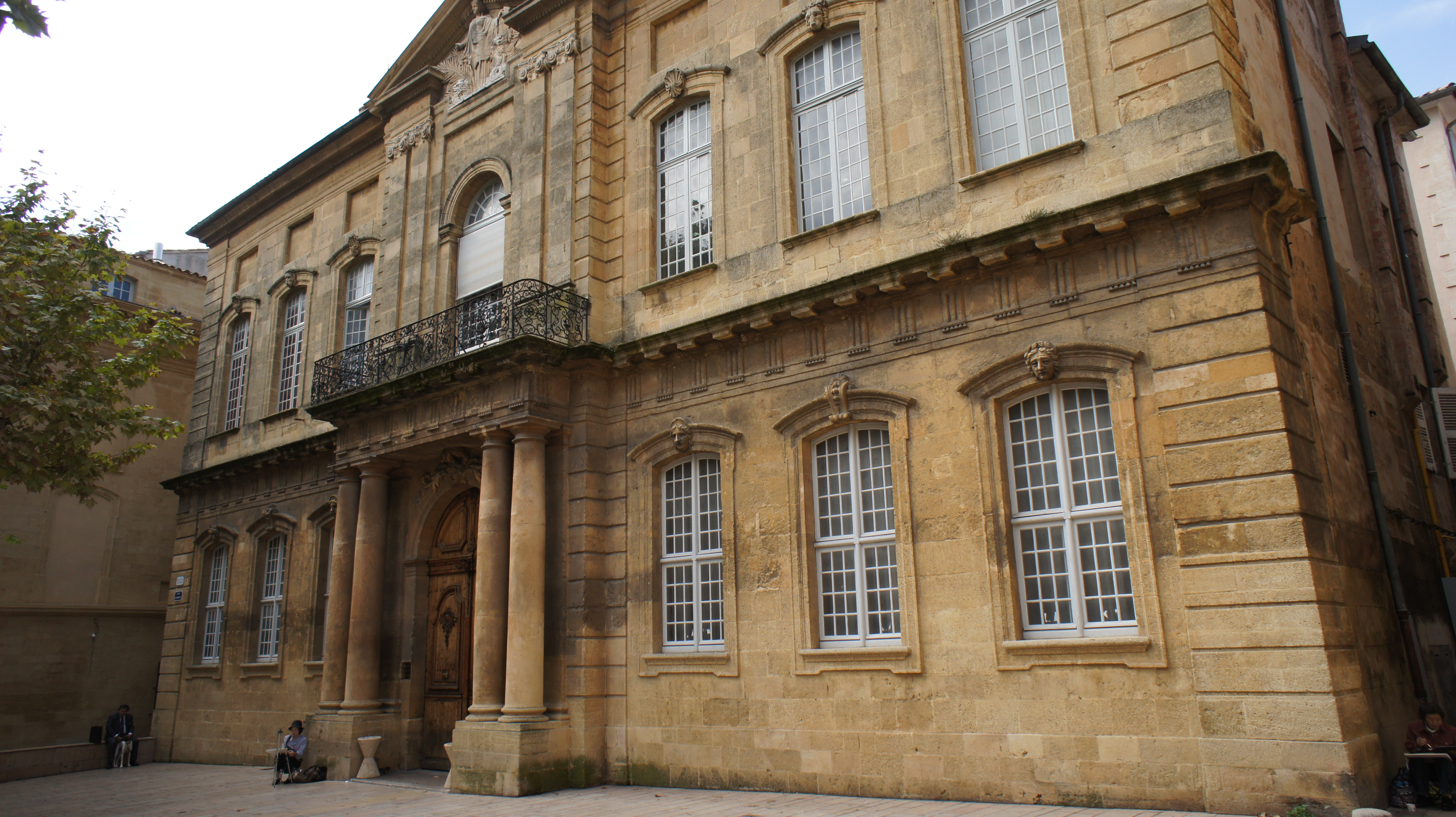
Palais de l'université in Aix-en-Provence

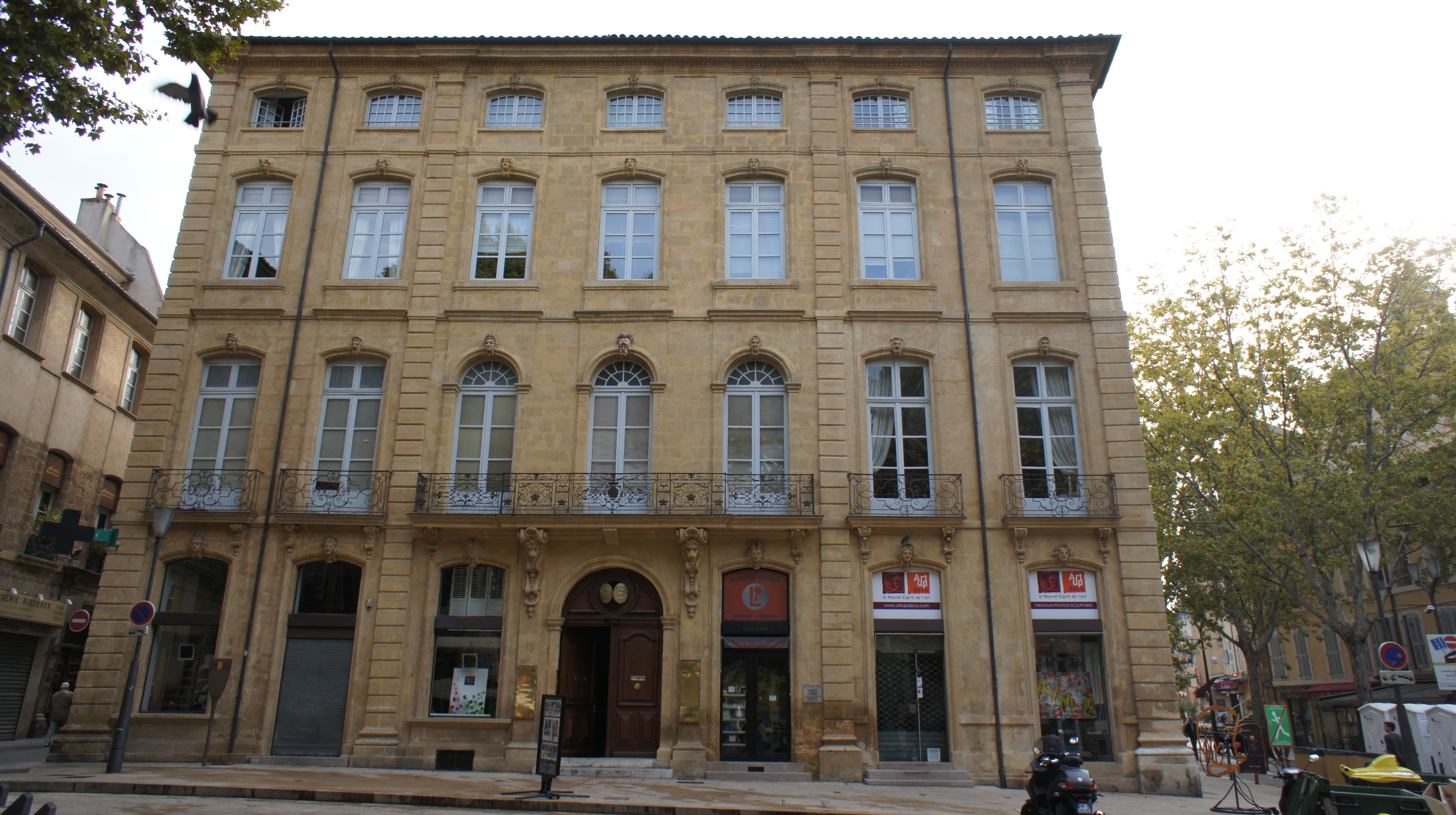
Hôtel du Poët in Aix-en-Provence

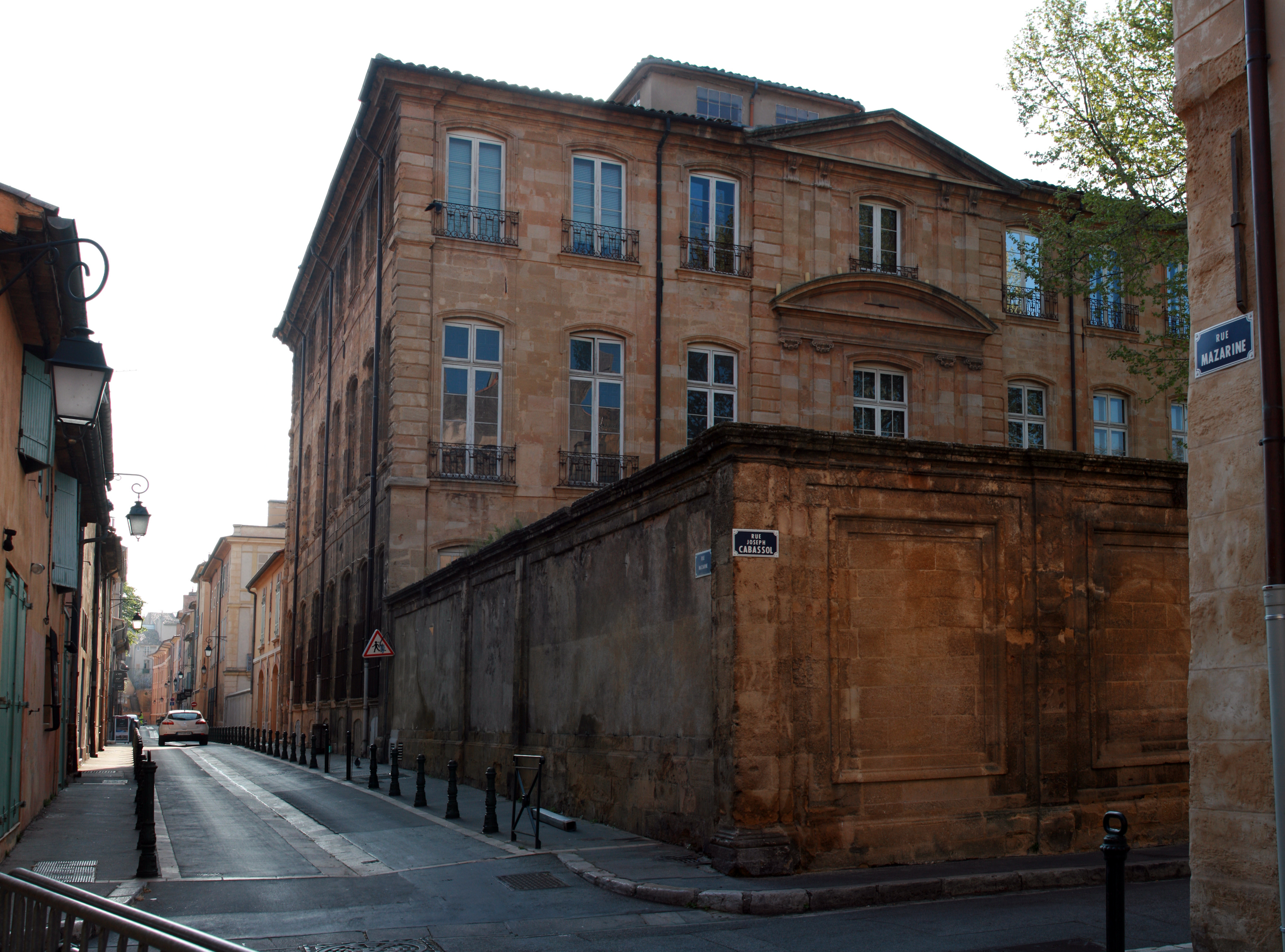
Hôtel de Caumont (designed with Robert de Cotte and Jean Aubert the Elder) in Aix-en-Provence

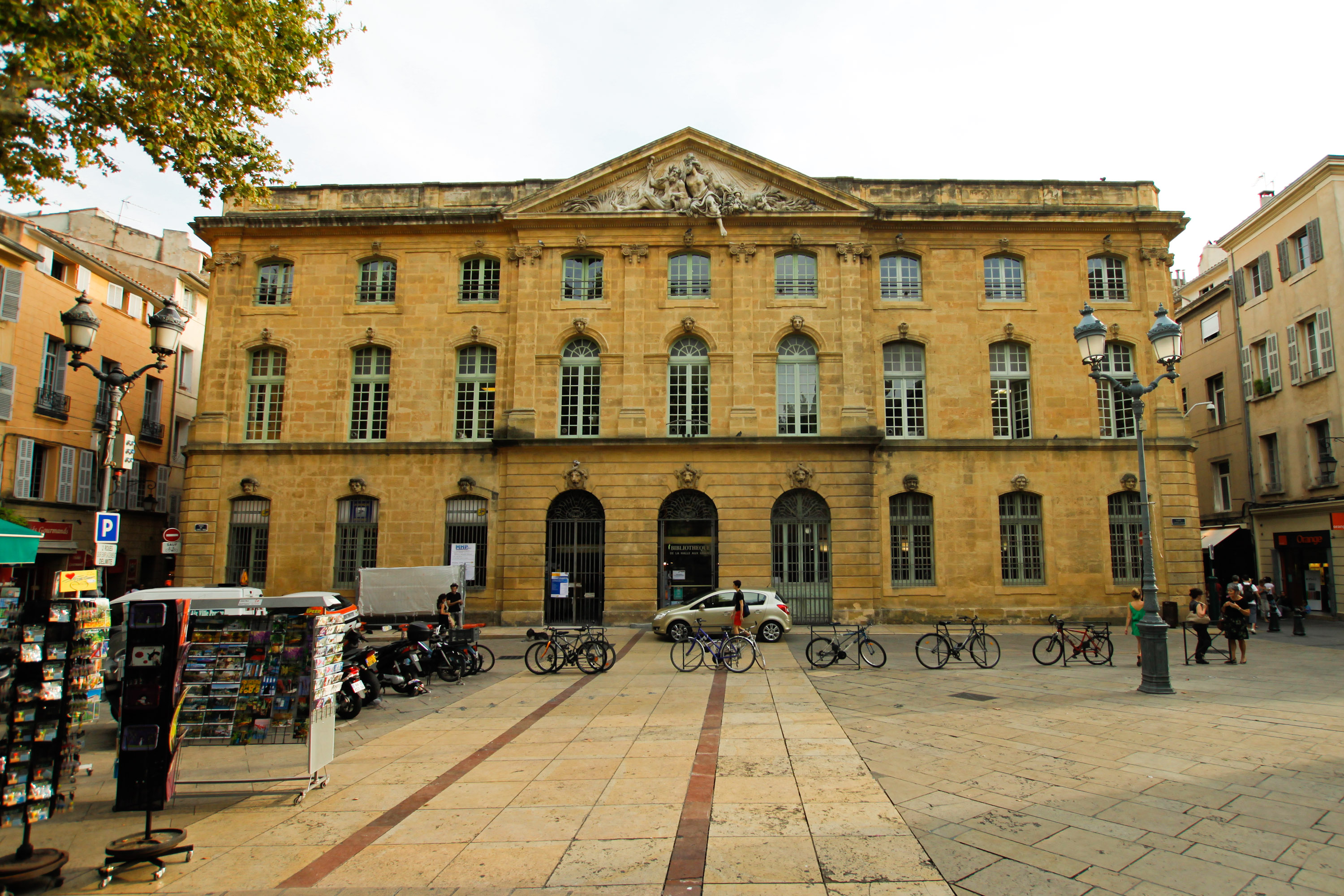
Halle aux grains (designed with his father) in Aix-en-Provence
