= Chestnut Trees and Farm at Jas de Bouffan (Cézanne, Moscow) =

Painting by Paul Cézanne

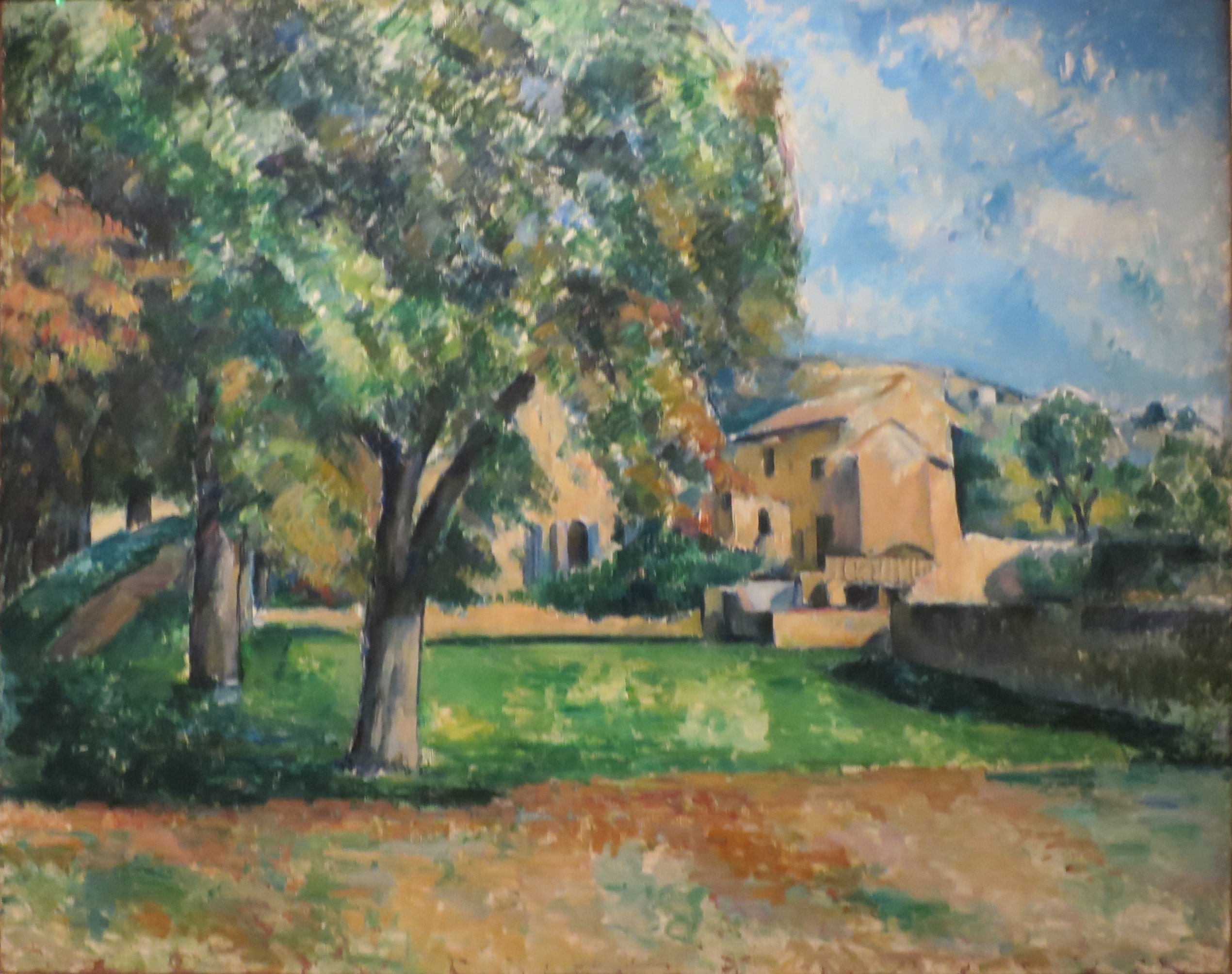
- Artist: Paul Cézanne
- Year: 1886
- Medium: oil on canvas
- Dimensions: 72 cm × 91 cm (28 in × 36 in)
- Location: Pushkin Museum of Fine Arts, Moscow

Chestnut Trees and Farm at Jas de Bouffan or Trees in a Park is an oil on canvas painting by the French Post-Impressionist artist Paul Cézanne, created c. 1886. It depicts the home of the Cézanne family, where the artist spent his holidays. It is held at the Pushkin Museum, in Moscow.

== Description ==
In the center of the canvas, evoking an airy Provençal landscape, stands a row of mature trees lining a narrow dirt road. They form a chaotic pattern that flattens the landscape, stripping it of expressive detail.

To the right of this row of trees begins a series of hills, their contours appearing irregular and ill-defined. The trees in the foreground resemble the silhouettes of awkward dancers frozen in strange poses—as if struck by some startling spectacle that evoked astonishment, wonder, or fear.

The source of this energy remains unknown, yet the branches at the top of the composition form a complex tangle of interlaced lines, contrasting sharply with the simplicity of the foreground in this tranquil rural scene. Beyond the dirt road, atop the hill, sits a multi-story beige house with a small annex to its left. The building, composed of two distinct sections, is set against a windswept sky rendered in various shades of blue.

Cézanne created this painting with notable economy: the brushstrokes are thin and precisely defined, the palette — a range of yellows and greens— is relatively simple, and parts of the surface representing the ground are left bare. Throughout his life, Cézanne experimented with spatial relationships in nature, working both from direct observation and from memory. In this piece, the bare, frail trees appear like a frieze against a backdrop of soft color zones — created here using watercolor on paper, rather than oil on canvas. The rigid, geometric volumes of the houses stand in contrast to the freely painted, "vibrant" green treetops and the striking blue sky.

== See also ==
- List of paintings by Paul Cézanne
