= Henri Gautier =

French aristocrat, landowner and public official

- Born: 1676; Aix-en-Provence, Provence
- Died: 1757 (aged 80–81)
- Occupations: Landowner; Treasurer of the Estates of Provence
- Spouse: Anne le Gros
- Children: Joseph-Antoine de Gautier (Three daughters)

Henri Gautier (1676–1757) was a French aristocrat, landowner and public official.

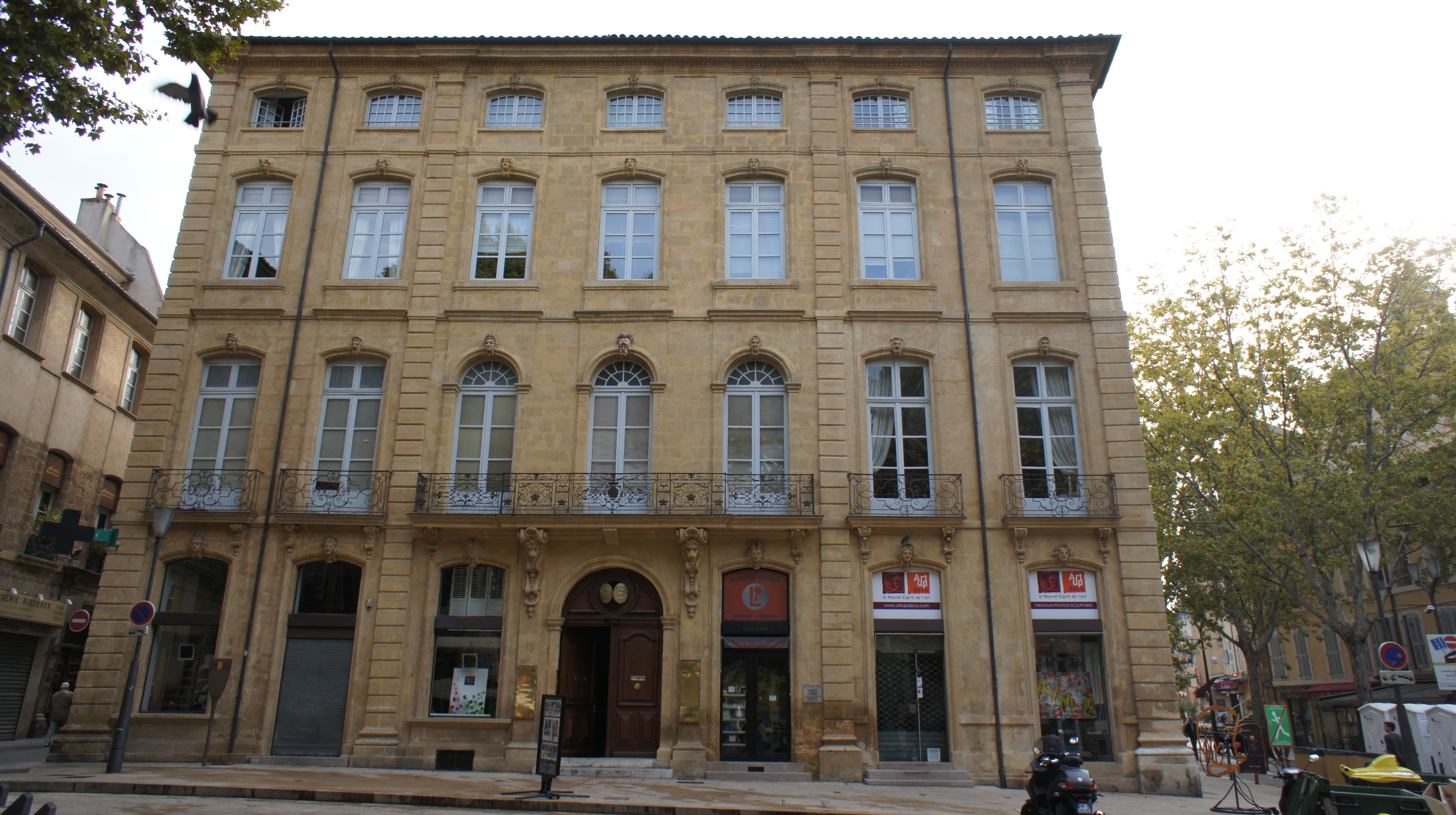
Hôtel du Poët

== Biography ==
=== Early life ===
Henri Gautier was born in 1676 in Aix-en-Provence.

=== Career ===
He was a clerk to Jean-Claude Guyon, a notary. Later, he served as Treasurer of the Estates of Provence.

He purchased the lands of Le Poët, Vernègues and Valavoire. On 24 April 1724 King Louis XV granted him a hereditary title of nobility. In 1730, he purchased the land at the top of the Cours Mirabeau where there was an old watermill and commissioned architect Georges Vallon to design a hôtel particulier that came to be known as the Hôtel du Poët.

=== Personal life ===
He was married to Anne le Gros. They had a son and four daughters:

- Joseph-Antoine de Gautier. He inherited his father's aristocratic titles and served as an Advisor to the Parlement of Aix-en-Provence. He married Anne de Boisson, daughter of Joseph-Gaspard de Boisson and Anne de Pisany de Saint-Laurent. They had children.
- (first daughter). She married into the de Dedons de Lis family.
- (second daughter). She married into the de Saporta family.
- (third daughter). She married into the de Rians family.
- (fourth daughter). She married into the de Regina family.

He died in 1757.
