= Arue, Landes =

Arue
- Commune
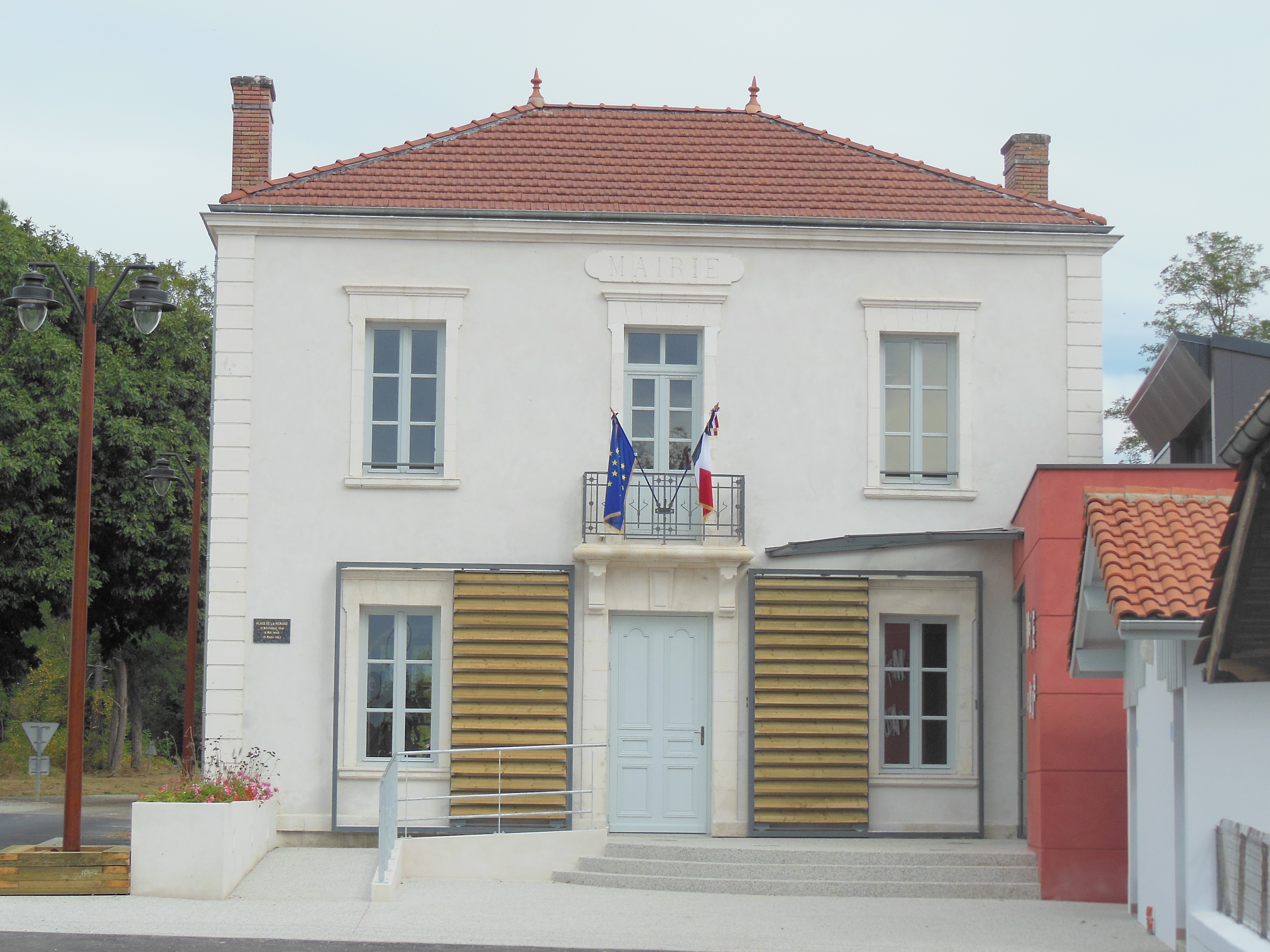
- Town hall
- Location of Arue
- Location within France Location within Nouvelle-Aquitaine
- Coordinates: 44°03′40″N 0°21′01″W
- Country: France
- Region: Nouvelle-Aquitaine
- Department: Landes
- Arrondissement: Mont-de-Marsan
- Canton: Haute Lande Armagnac
- Intercommunality: CC Landes Armagnac

Government
  - Mayor (2020–2026): Frédéric Duprat
- Area^{1}: 48.11 km^{2} (18.58 sq mi)
- Highest elevation: 113 m (371 ft)
- Lowest elevation: 47 m (154 ft)
- Population (2023): 356
  - Density: 7.40/km^{2} (19.2/sq mi)
- Time zone: UTC+01:00 (CET)
  - Summer (DST): UTC+02:00 (CEST)
- INSEE/Postal code: 40014 /40120
- ^{1} French Land Register data, which excludes lakes, ponds, glaciers > 1 km^{2} (0.386 sq mi or 247 acres) and river estuaries.

Arue (French pronunciation: [aʁy]; Occitan: Arua) is a commune of the Landes department in Nouvelle-Aquitaine in southwestern France.

== Population ==
Historical population
Year	Pop.	±% p.a.
1968	425	—
1975	347	−2.86%
1982	294	−2.34%
1990	290	−0.17%
1999	286	−0.15%
2007	299	+0.56%
2012	310	+0.73%
2017	348	+2.34%
2023	356	+0.38%
Source: INSEE

== Transport ==
Between 1907 and 1934, Arue was a station on the 12-kilometre (7.5 mi) long 750 mm (2 ft 5 1/2 in) gauge Chemin de fer Économiques Forestiers des Landes railway line, which ran from Roquefort to Lencouacq.

== See also ==
- Communes of the Landes department
