= Raymond Charles Péré =

Turkish-French architect

- Born: 4 May 1854; Roquefort, Landes, France
- Died: 15 October 1929 (aged 75); İzmir, Turkey
- Occupation: Architect
- Buildings: İzmir Clock Tower, Chacha Clock Tower

Raymond Charles Péré (French: [ʁɛmɔ̃ ʃaʁl peʁe]; 1854–1929) was a French architect, who was born at Roquefort-de-Marsan in the Landes, France, and arrived originally as a French teacher in 1880 at Smyrna (Izmir), married Anaïs Russo there and spent the rest of his life in İzmir, Turkey. He is best remembered as the designer of the İzmir Clock Tower, the landmark of İzmir situated in the city's Konak Square.

== Early life ==
He was born in 1854 at Roquefort, Landes, France, to Jean Jacques Péré and his wife Marie Pargade. He married Anaïs Russo, the daughter of a prominent Levantine family of Italian from İzmir. They had ten children named Ferdinand, Pierre, Charles, Henriette, Bernard, François, Marie, Michel, Joseph and Louis.

== Works ==
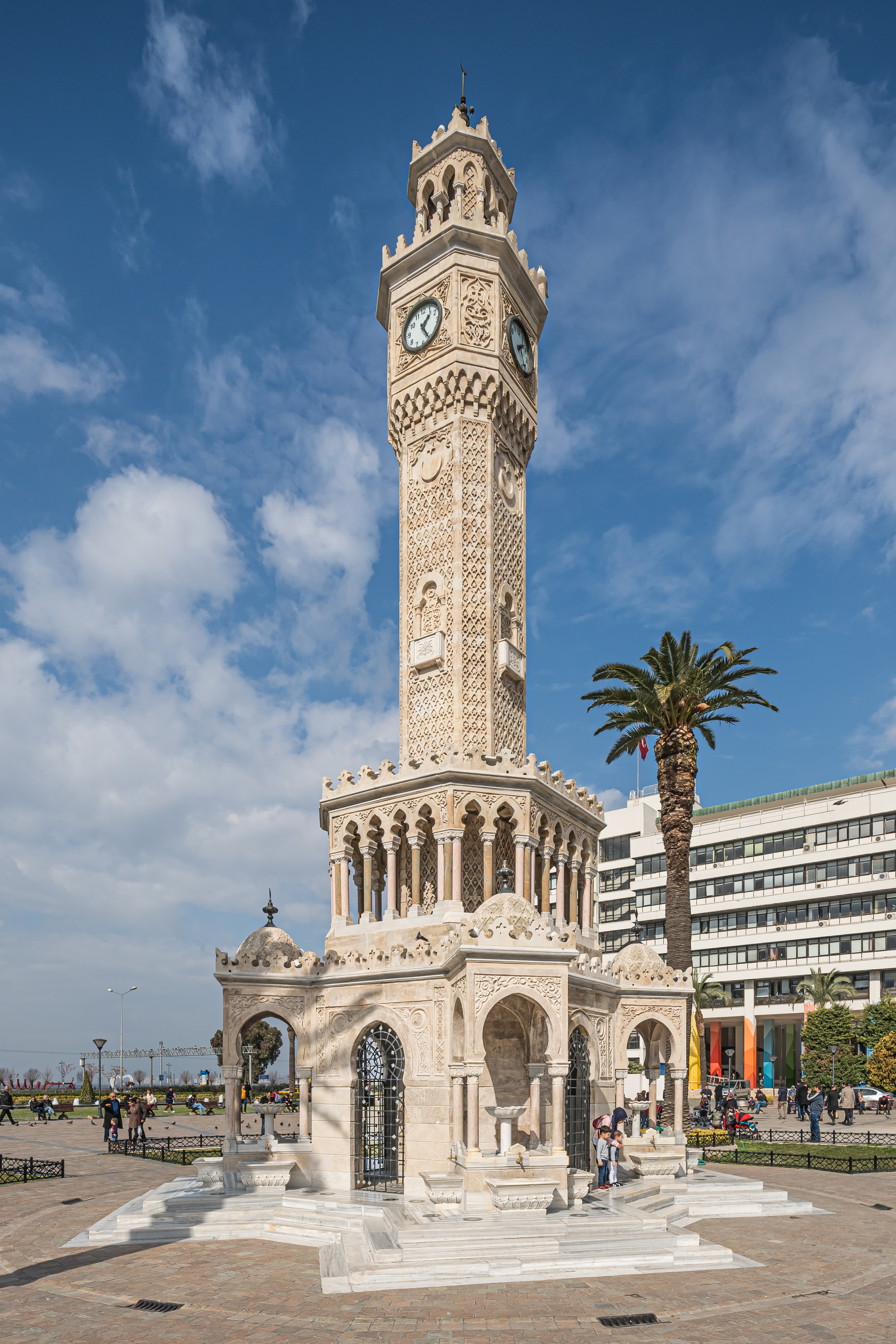
İzmir Clock Tower

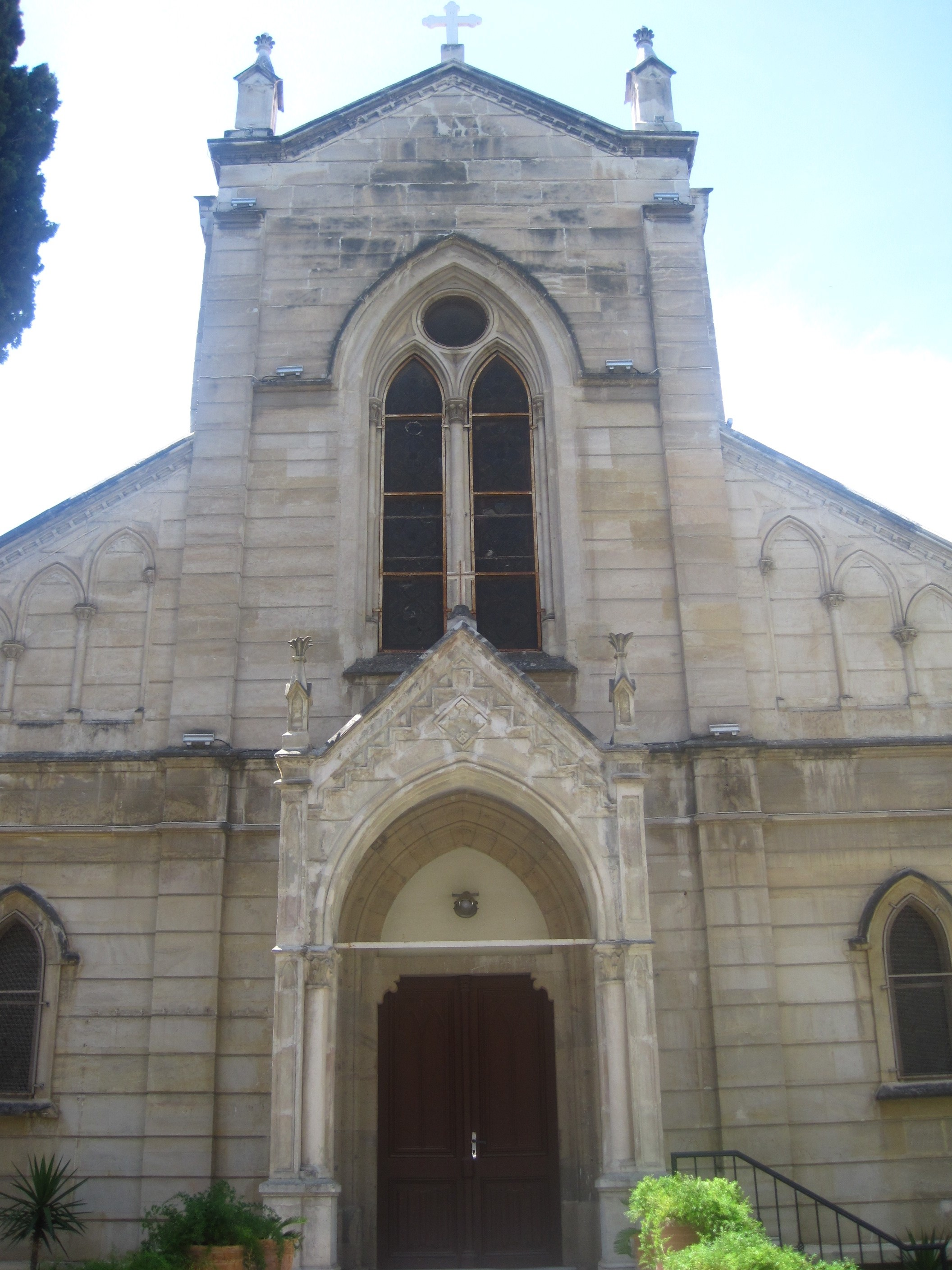
St. Helena Church

Péré was commissioned to design a clock tower in commemoration of the silver anniversary of Ottoman Sultan Abdülhamid II's (reigned 1876–1909) ascent to the throne. Completed in 1901, the structure of 25 m (82 ft) height with North African inspired motifs is the landmark of the city today.

Péré's other important work is the Church of St. Helen in Karşıyaka district of İzmir. It was built with the permission of the sultan in 1904 in "Gothic Revival" style on land donated by a prominent Levantine, Nicola Aliotti. He performed also the stained-glass work and added statues of the relevant saints in the interior. The church served the district's Roman Catholic community. France's former prime minister Édouard Balladur (in office between 1993–1995), was born in Karşıyaka in 1929 and baptized in this church.

He is also the architect of one of İzmir's first hospitals, which was built in 1908 as an annex to the French Hospital Complex following a restoration work. Recently, the building serves as the emergency room of the State Hospital in Alsancak.

A building near the Köprü Mosque in the Quarantine Quarter of İzmir, known today as the Ayşe Mayda Mansion, is considered to be Péré's work. The mansion was built for Grand Vizier Mehmed Kamil Pasha (1833–1913), governor of İzmir from 1895 to 1907, as a Turkish interpretation of the "Art Nouveau" style.

Raymond Charles Péré made pencil drawings of the area including the French Catholic mission in İzmir, undertook the restoration of the Church of St. Polycarp, the oldest church in İzmir built in 1625, and made the church's interior wall paintings (frescoes). Here, he put himself in the scene of a fresco called "The Martyrdom of St. Polycarp", depicting İzmir's bishop and guardian saint being murdered by the Romans in 155 AD. Péré's daughter Marie is seen as Mary on a side wall painting known as the "Saint Anne and the infant Mary".

In addition to his works as public buildings, Raymond Charles Péré is also known for creating architectural designs for some houses for Levantine families residing in Alsancak and Buca, even though it is not easy today to identify them.

== Death ==
Péré died on October 15, 1929, in İzmir. After his death, his wife and children emigrated in 1929 to France.
