= Arue =

Arue may refer to:

- Arue, Landes, France, a commune
- Arue, French Polynesia, France, a commune
  - A.S. Arue, a football club based in Arue
- "Arue" (song) a song by Bump Of Chicken
