= St. Helena Church =

Coordinates: 38.45475°N 27.11446°E

Helena
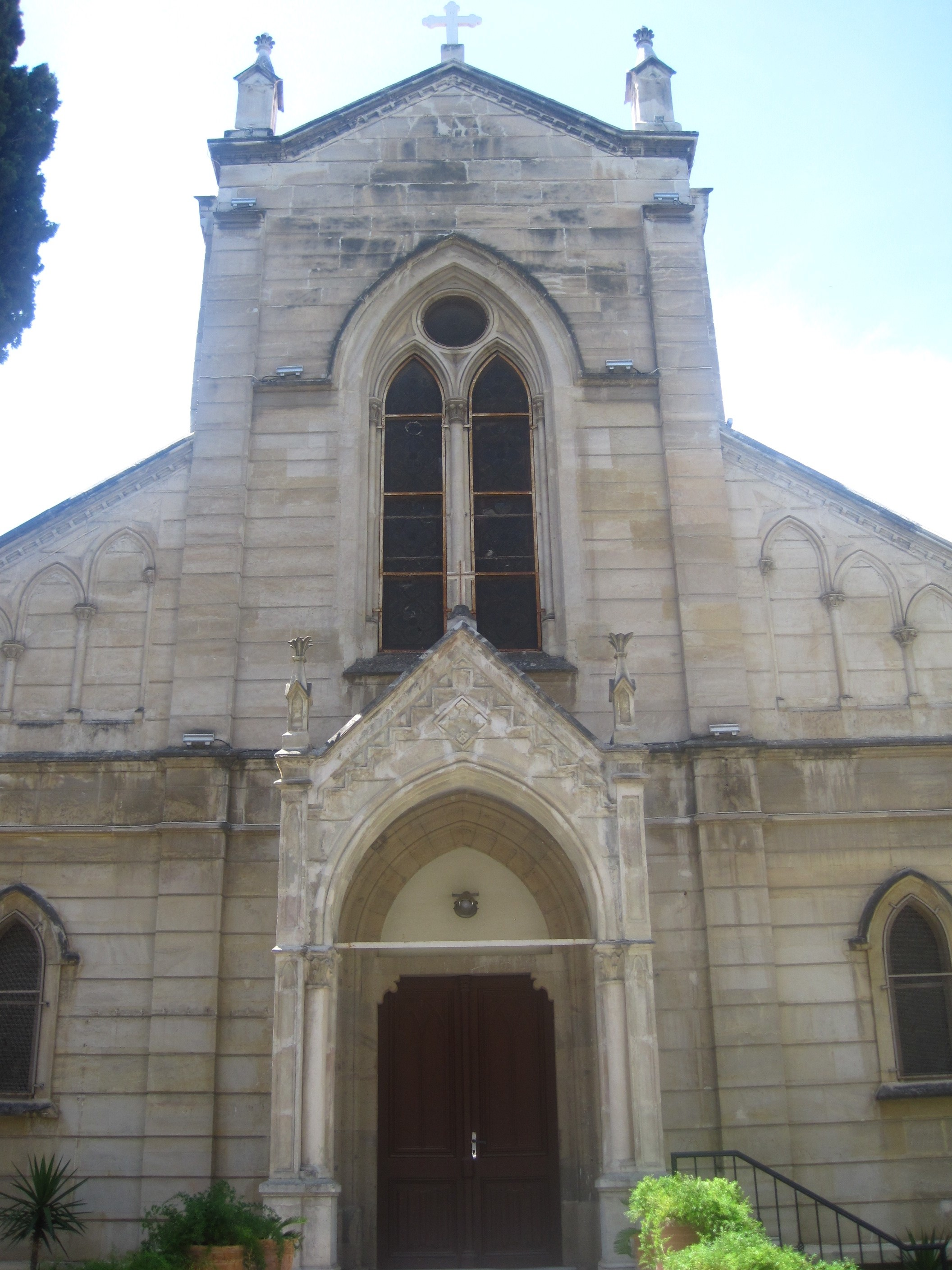
- Pictured in 2016
- Helena
- Country: Turkey
- Denomination: Catholic

Architecture
- Architect: Raymond Charles Péré
- Completed: 1904

St. Helena is a Catholic church in Karşıyaka, Turkey. It was built in 1904 and designed by Raymond Charles Péré. The church is named after Saint Helena of Constantinople, the wife of Roman Emperor Constantius Chlorus and mother of Eastern Roman Emperor Constantine the Great. She is thought to have discovered and preserved the True Cross and other relics of Jesus.

== History ==
St. Helena Catholic Church was designed by Raymond Charles Péré, the architect of İzmir Clock Tower in Konak. The church rose on land allocated to the Catholic Community of Father Don Alfonso Vallery in the early 20th century.

A century earlier, Cordelio began to attract the attention of the foreign colony that came to Turkey for work-related reasons. The Sultans of the time, wanting to keep pace with the modernization already in full swing in Europe, sought specialized personnel for the construction of railways, tramways, telecommunication systems, and the banking system. Many people, enticed by the conditions offered, chose to settle in Turkey. Those working in Izmir and its surroundings preferred the suburbs. Among the various suburban areas, Karşıyaka attracted a significant number of new foreign residents, almost all of whom were Catholic.

The Church soon took steps to address the need for religious assistance and, in 1868, sent a priest to Karşıyaka to provide spiritual care for the resident Catholic community. The diligent priest, whose name has not reached us, immediately planned to build a small chapel, which was already operational by 1874. Based on information from the elders of our community, we can confirm that this chapel stood on 1716 Street, opposite the Karakol (police station), on the short stretch leading from Çarşı to the railway tracks.

The Parish

The Catholic community must have been experiencing considerable growth, as just eight years later, in 1882, the then-Archbishop, Monsignor André Timoni, elevated the small chapel to the status of a parish church. Don Alfonso M. Vallery was appointed as the first parish priest. He not only led the parish for an impressive 45 years but also became the heart of the community during the years of construction of the new church, which later became the parish's new location. During the years the small chapel served as the parish, 405 baptisms, 48 marriages, and 190 deaths were recorded.

Count Nicola Aliotti, a man of deep Christian principles, offered to donate a 2,100-square-foot plot to Archbishop Monsignor André Timoni for the construction of a new parish church that would meet the pastoral needs of the Catholic community. After the donation was formalized, the necessary paperwork was quickly processed. Sultan Abdul Hamid II granted approval for the project, authorizing the city’s governor, Pasha Kamil, to draft and issue the firman, or official decree, which granted permission to build the church. This firman is dated Sefer 18, 1312 (April 18, 1902). Notably, one of the conditions stipulated that the total cost should not exceed 1,000 lira, and funds had to be voluntarily collected from the Catholics in the neighborhood.

With permission in hand, the search for an architect began, and engineer Raymond Pere, known for designing the clock tower in Konak—a symbol of modern Izmir—was selected. Pere designed a neo-Gothic church and prepared plans for ecclesiastical and civil approval. Once all permits were obtained, construction began. June 17, 1904, is inscribed indelibly in the annals of the Catholic community. On that day, Archbishop Monsignor André Timoni, assisted by Canon Monsignor Capponi and Father Grangier, a Lazarist, blessed and laid the cornerstone for the church. The event was attended by a jubilant community, including the French Consul General. The masonry work was completed in 1906, and in 1908, the windows were adorned with beautiful stained glass. T

Inside, the pointed arches that separate the central nave from the side aisles are supported by twelve white marble columns from the Marmara Islands. The apse features three high lancet windows and two lower ones on either side of the Carrara marble altar, which is also in Gothic style. The vaults, both the central and side ones, are ribbed and rest on pointed arches. Five windows line each side of the central nave above, with another four on each side below in the side aisles. In addition to the main altar, there are two side chapels, one dedicated to the Sacred Heart of Jesus and the other to the Immaculate Conception of Lourdes. The church's dimensions are 20 meters deep for the side aisles and 18.2 meters for the central nave, up to the presbytery, which is 10.8 meters wide. The presbytery is 6 meters deep and 5.4 meters wide, and the central nave’s interior height reaches 14 meters.

Structural issues led to an interior renovation in 1968, with efforts to protect the church's historical character. The exterior remains unrenovated. To prevent damage, the brick arches were reinforced with concrete.

== Services ==
St. Helena Catholic Church is actively used.

Dailly prayers services are held in Turkish, for the local community and guests. The church is also open for visitors on opening hours. The updated schedule is to be found in the church's webpage.

== Design ==
This church is built on the Basilica plan, inspired by Gothic architecture. It avoids the use of columns along the main axis. A big gallery sits between the small galleries. At the upper part of the church is an organ.

The church features built-in brick, concrete, and sandstone. The interior uses multiple marbles. Italian marble is used on an altar located at an apse, while the columns and heads located at the nave use Marmara marble. The most important statue is the first religious martyr of the city, St. Polycarp he church is a three-nave neo-Gothic structure with slender and harmonious lines. Its facade reflects the three naves, with the central span larger and taller, adorned with a large bifora topped by four pinnacles and a beautiful cross. Below, a lovely portico with two additional pinnacles is crowned by a cross, leading to the main entrance. The Church of St. Helena can rightly be counted among the most beautiful in the city.

Inside, the pointed arches that separate the central nave from the side aisles are supported by twelve white marble columns from the Marmara Islands. The apse features three high lancet windows and two lower ones on either side of the Carrara marble altar, which is also in Gothic style. The vaults, both the central and side ones, are ribbed and rest on pointed arches. Five windows line each side of the central nave above, with another four on each side below in the side aisles. In addition to the main altar, there are two side chapels, one dedicated to the Sacred Heart of Jesus and the other to the Immaculate Conception of Lourdes. The church's dimensions are 20 meters deep for the side aisles and 18.2 meters for the central nave, up to the presbytery, which is 10.8 meters wide. The presbytery is 6 meters deep and 5.4 meters wide, and the central nave’s interior height reaches 14 meters.

St. Helena is surrounded by residential buildings, in the center of Karşıyaka. The church is isolated from its surroundings by its garden. The church and its garden are protected with high walls and large doors that lead in a straight line to the church doors. In this case, the church has an axial approach.

The Great Earthquake

On February 2, 1974, at 2:04 a.m., the earth shook, and the people of Karşıyaka poured into the streets in terror. Father Domenico Bertogli, the parish priest at the time, wrote: "Never in living memory had such a powerful tremor been felt, although the Izmir region remains a seismic zone of the highest grade." The earthquake, which caused significant damage throughout the city, did not spare our church, a true gem of Gothic architecture.

Just ten years had passed since the restoration completed in 1964, and only three since the cleaning and restoration of the facade in 1971. But in a matter of seconds, that substantial investment was lost. The damage was extensive, and the cracks severe.

“The top of the facade,” Father Domenico continued, “leaned dangerously forward. The main entrance had to be closed immediately. On the right side, from the main door, three slabs fell from the outer wall onto the roof of the side nave, breaking several square meters of the roof. On the left side, some stone slabs shifted but did not fall.

“The interior suffered the most damage… a full inspection of the roof, framework, and walls is essential to avoid unpleasant surprises in the future.”

From these excerpts from Father Domenico's report, one can grasp the gravity of the damage to our church. Nevertheless, Father Domenico was hopeful that he could restore the church “beloved by Christians and admired by Muslims for its beauty.” Providence did not delay. With help from the Archbishop, the Capuchin Friars Minor superiors, various benefactors, and the local community, restoration work could begin quickly and was successfully completed. The Conventual Friars Minor, took over from the Capuchins ministering the church in 1997.

official webpage :

Webpage : https://ofmconv.org.tr/

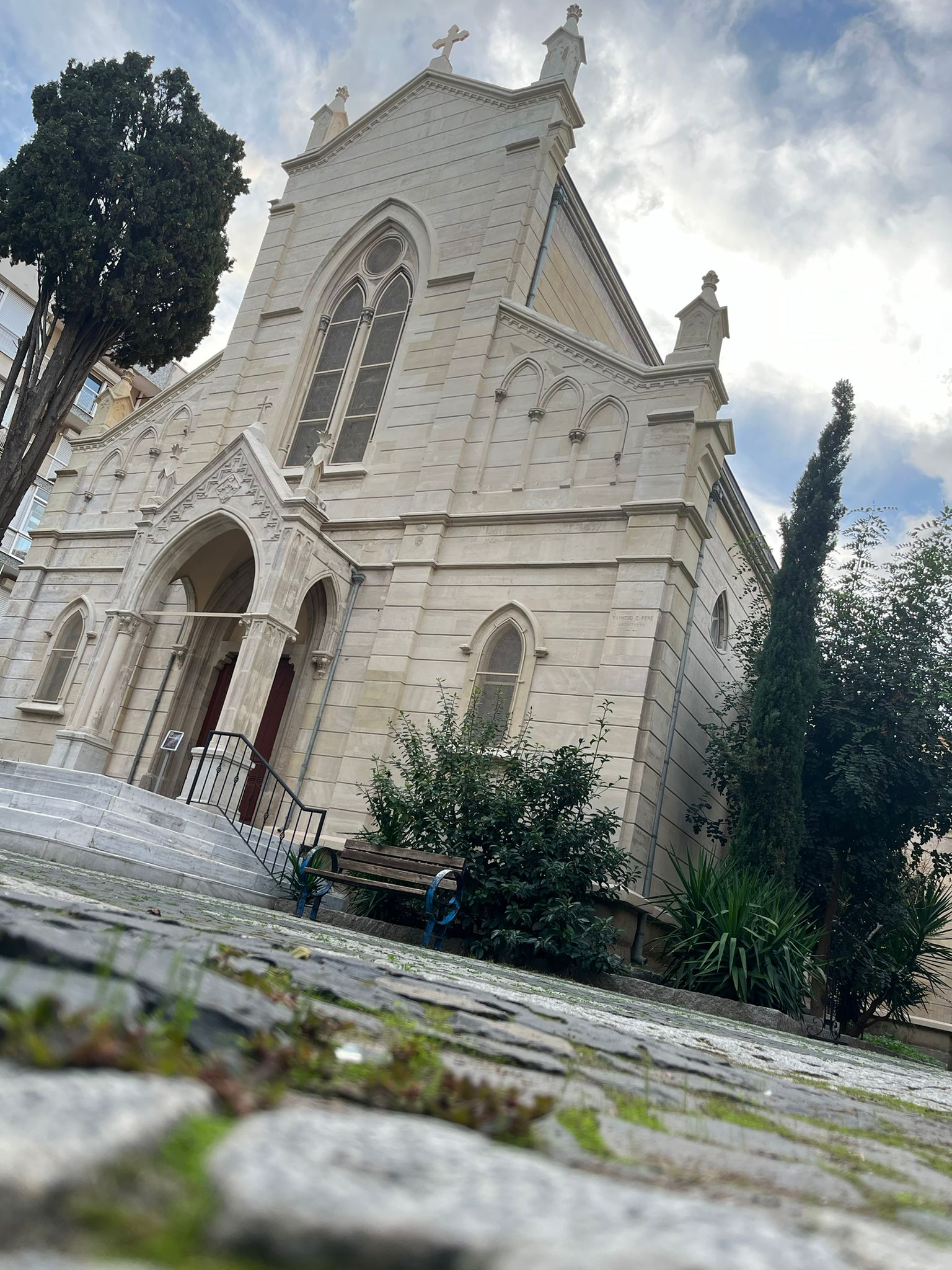
Front view of the church in 2024
