= 1755 in architecture =

The year 1755 in architecture involved some significant events.

== Events ==
- November 1 – 1755 Lisbon earthquake in Portugal. Among many buildings destroyed is the Ópera do Tejo, designed by Giovanni Carlo Galli-Bibiena, opened only on March 31. The workforce completing the Mafra National Palace at Mafra is diverted to reconstruction work in Lisbon.

== Buildings and structures ==
=== Buildings ===
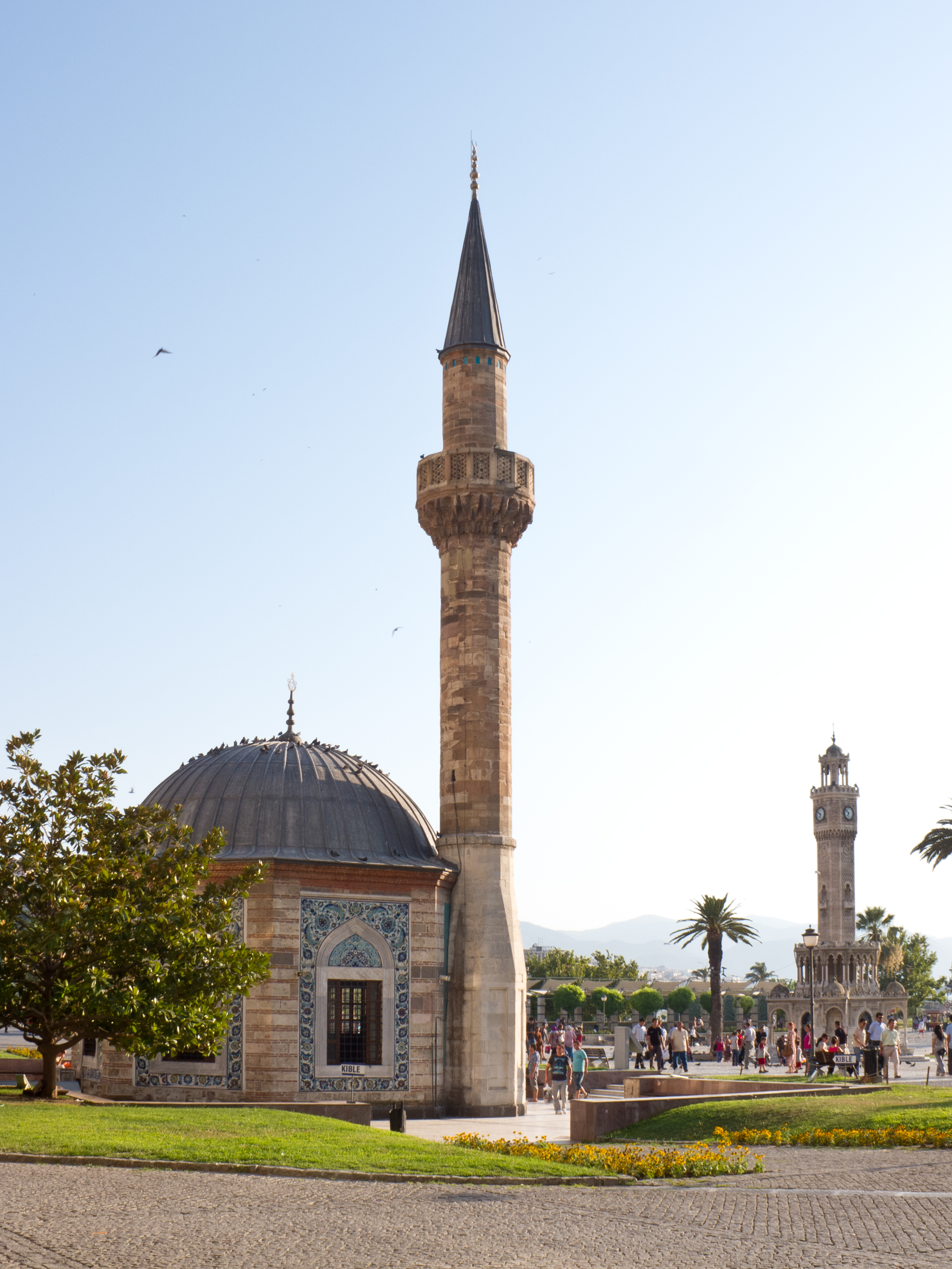
Yalı Mosque

- Groote Kerk, Galle, Zeilan, is inaugurated
- Reformed Church of Shawangunk, New York, is inaugurated
- Puning Temple of Chengde, Hebei Province, China is begun
- St John the Evangelist's Church, Lancaster, England, probably designed by Henry Sephton, is completed
- Teatro San Benedetto in Venice is inaugurated
- Church of the Savior on Bolvany in Moscow is consecrated
- Nuruosmaniye Mosque in Istanbul, designed by Mustafa Ağa and Simeon Kalfa, is completed
- Yalı Mosque in İzmir is built
- Towers and domes of Pažaislis Monastery in Kaunas, Polish–Lithuanian Commonwealth, are added
- Hôtel Gayot in Strasbourg is completed
- Hatch Court, Somerset, England, designed by the amateur Thomas Prowse, is built at about this date

== Births ==
- January 29 (bapt.) – William Porden, English architect (died 1822)
- August 5 – James Playfair, Scottish Neoclassical architect (died 1794)
- September 3 – Johan Martin Quist, Danish architect (died 1818)
- Andreas Hallander, Danish architect (died 1828)
- Étienne Sulpice Hallet, French-born American architect (died 1825)

== Deaths ==
- Johan Cornelius Krieger, Danish architect (born 1683)
