= Konak Mosque =

Mosque in İzmir, Turkey

Coordinates: 38°25′08.7″N 27°07′45.6″E

- Konak Camii
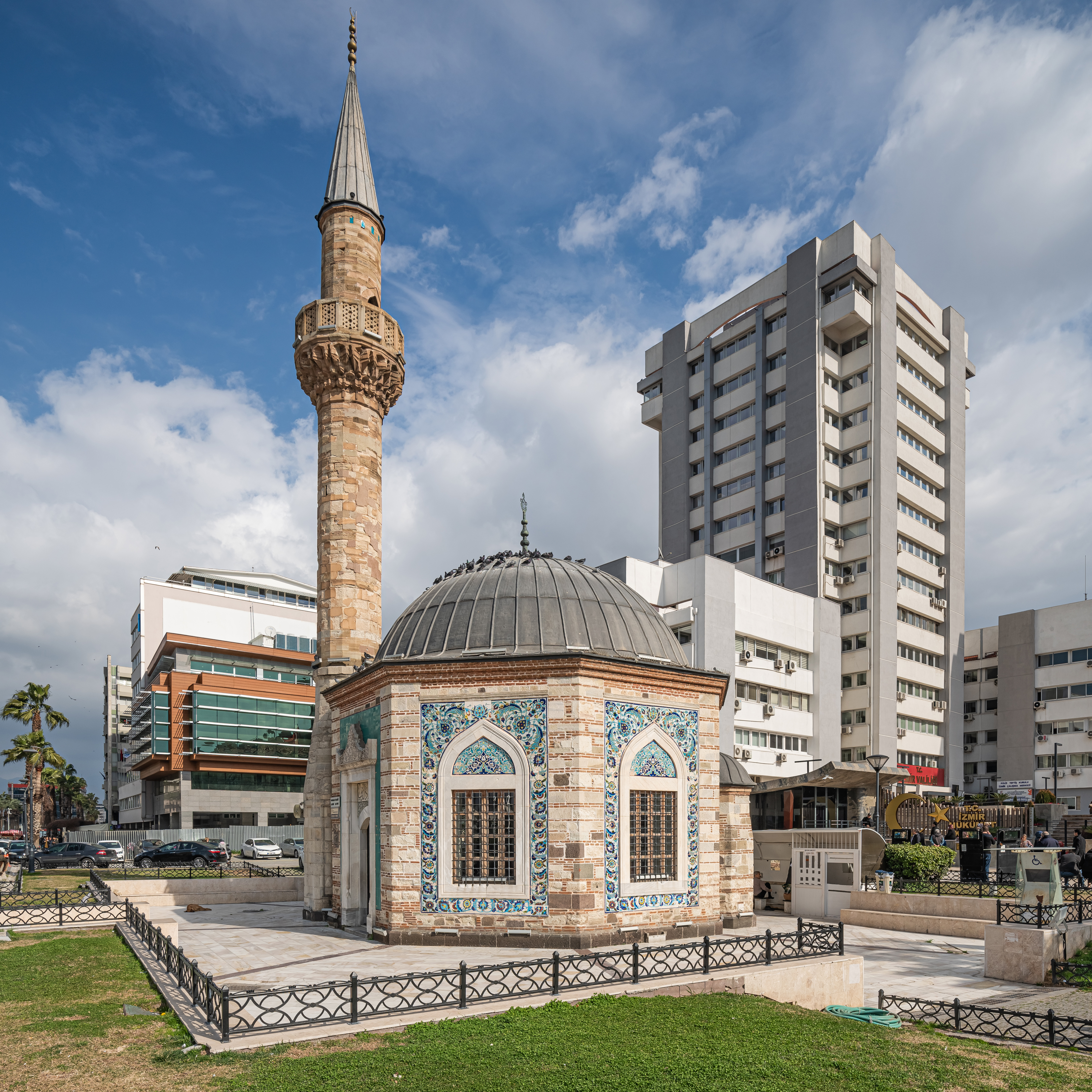

Religion
- Affiliation: Islam

Location
- Location: Konak, İzmir, Turkey
- Interactive map of Konak Mosque

Architecture
- Type: Mosque
- Established: 1755

Konak Mosque (Turkish: Konak Camii), also called Yalı Mosque, is a mosque in İzmir, Turkey. It is located on Konak Square in the heart of the city next to the Governor's Mansion and the İzmir Clock Tower. Despite its relatively small size, it is considered one of the landmarks of the city for its distinctive octagonal shape and elaborate tilework.

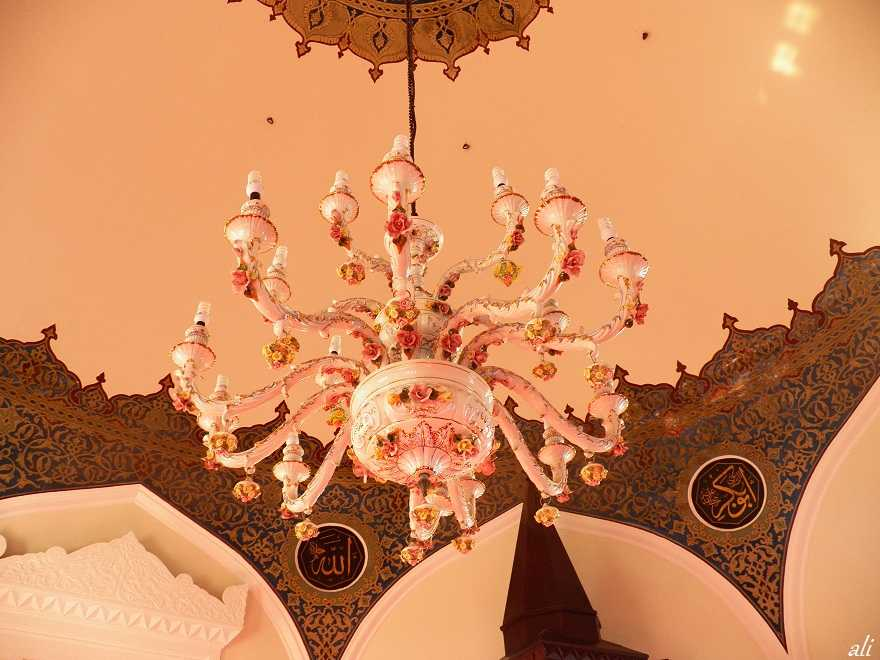
Chandelier in the interior

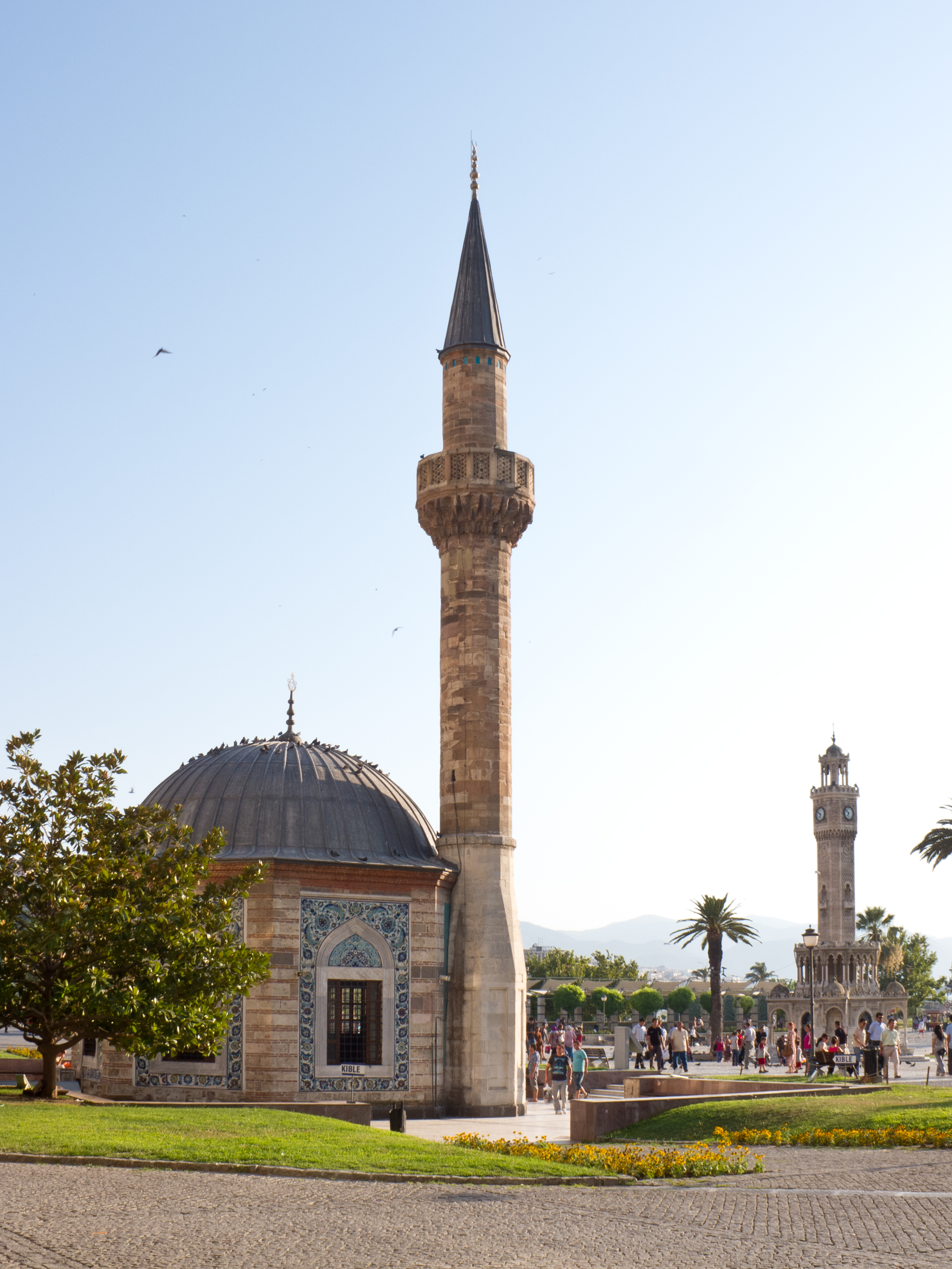
The Mosque with the İzmir Clock Tower in the background

The Mosque was constructed in 1755 under the patronage of Ayşe Hanım, the wife of Katibzade Mehmed Pasha who governed İzmir at the time. The outer tiles were brought from Kütahya. It has a single dome and minaret and unusually for a mosque, only one entrance. The interior is lit by a chandelier by Ümran Baradan.
