= Saint Polycarp Church =

- Aziz Polikarp Kilisesi
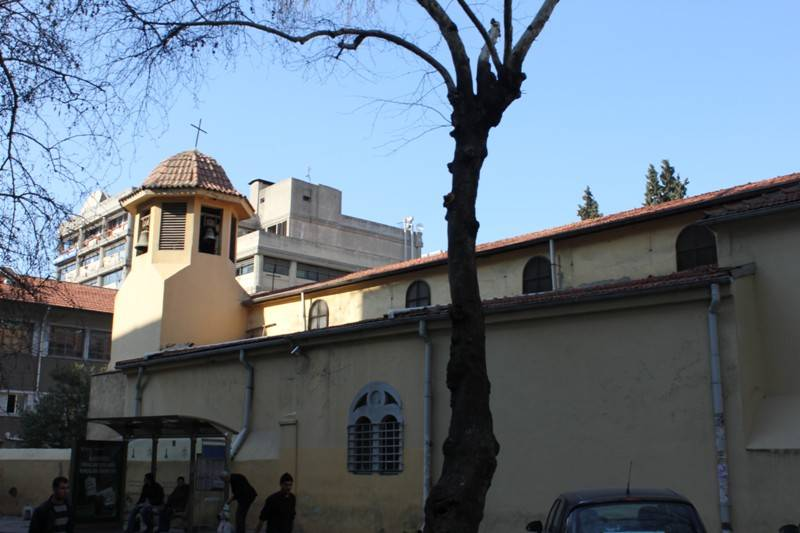

Religion
- Affiliation: Catholic Church
- Patron: Polycarp

Location
- Location: Konak, İzmir, Turkey
- Interactive map of Saint Polycarp Church
- Coordinates: 38°25′32.2″N 27°08′08.5″E

Architecture
- Completed: 1625
- Materials: Stone; brick

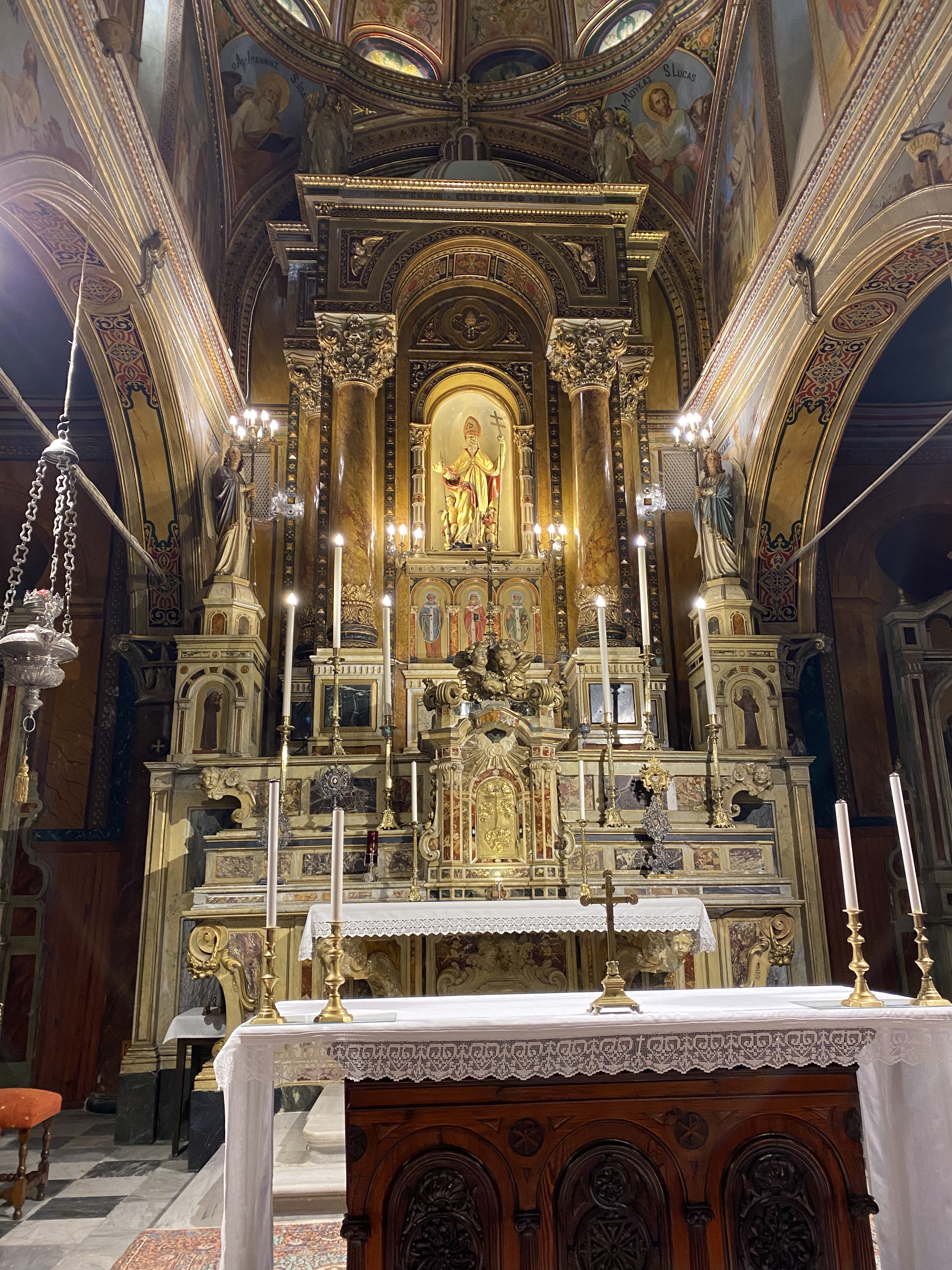
Interior of the church

Saint Polycarp Church (Turkish: Aziz Polikarp Kilisesi) is a Catholic church in İzmir, Turkey. Its patron saint is Polycarp.

== History ==
Saint Polycarp Church was built in 1625 with the permission of the Ottoman Sultan Suleiman I and at the request of the French King Louis XIII. The church building was damaged in the 1688 Smyrna earthquake and the fire that broke out in the following months. It was repaired between 1690–1691. The monastery of the church was damaged in the fire in 1763. The church was restored in 1775 with the contribution of the French King Louis XVI and became a three-nave basilica. In 1820, a marble commemorative plaque was hung in the church in honor of Louis XIII. The church, in which chapels were added during the restoration carried out between 1892–1989, was decorated with frescoes depicting the life of Polycarp, made by French architect Raymond Charles Péré. It was destroyed by the great fire of Smyrna and was rebuilt in 1929.

== Architecture ==
Built using stone and brick, the church is now a rectangular basilica with three naves. It is located in the east–west direction. There is an octagonal bell tower in the southwest of the church.

== See also ==
- Levantines (Latin Christians)
