= Chemin de fer Économiques Forestiers des Landes =

Narrow gauge railway in Landes, France

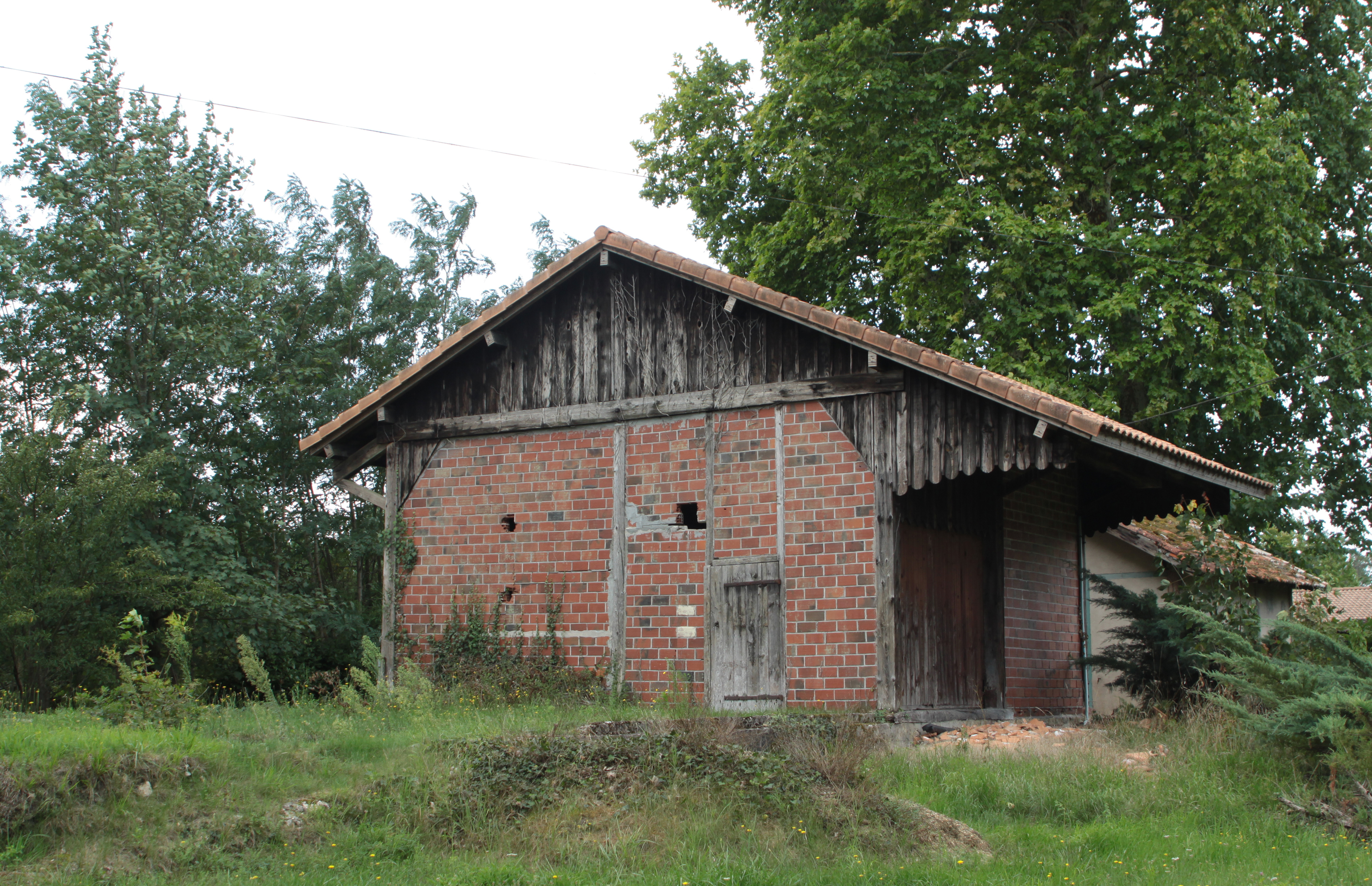
- Station building at Lencouacq-Bourg, 2011

Overview
- Status: Closed
- Owner: Compagnie des Chemin de fer Économiques Forestiers des Landes
- Locale: Landes, France
- Termini: Roquefort; Lencouacq-Jourets

History
- Opened: 1907
- Closed: 1934

Technical
- Line length: 12 km (7.5 mi)
- Track gauge: 750 mm (2 ft 5 1/2 in)

The Chemin de Fer Économiques Forestiers des Landes (French pronunciation: [ʃəmɛ̃ də fɛʁ ekɔnɔmik fɔʁɛstje de lɑ̃d]) was a narrow gauge railway in Landes, France, which operated between 1907 and 1934. It was the only 750 mm (2 ft 5 1/2 in) gauge railway in France.

== History ==
The CF Économiques Forestiers des Landes opened in 1907. The 12-kilometre (7.5 mi) long 750 mm (2 ft 5 1/2 in) gauge line ran between Roquefort and Lencouacq-Jourets. It was the only public railway in France built to that gauge. The choice of gauge was said to have been influenced by the purchase of two second-hand 0-4-0T steam locomotives. When narrow gauge railways were first proposed in France, it was intended they could be constructed in either 750 mm or metre (3 ft 3 3/8 in) gauge, however pressure from the French military made metre gauge compulsory in 1888. Later 600 mm (1 ft 11 5/8 in) gauge lines were allowed. Traffic declined after 1918, and the line closed in 1934.
