= Konak Square =

Busy square in the Konak district of İzmir, Turkey

Coordinates: 38°25′05″N 27°07′40″E

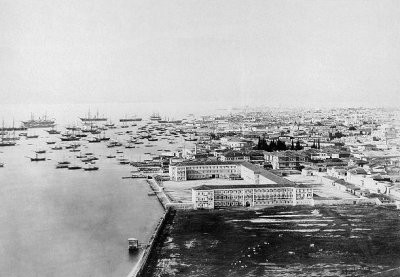
Konak Square in 1865

Konak Square (

Turkish: Konak Meydanı) is a busy square at the southern end of Atatürk Avenue in the Konak district of İzmir, Turkey. The square is named after the Vali Konağı (Governor's Mansion) of İzmir Province, which is located here (konak means mansion in Turkish.)

== Buildings in the square ==
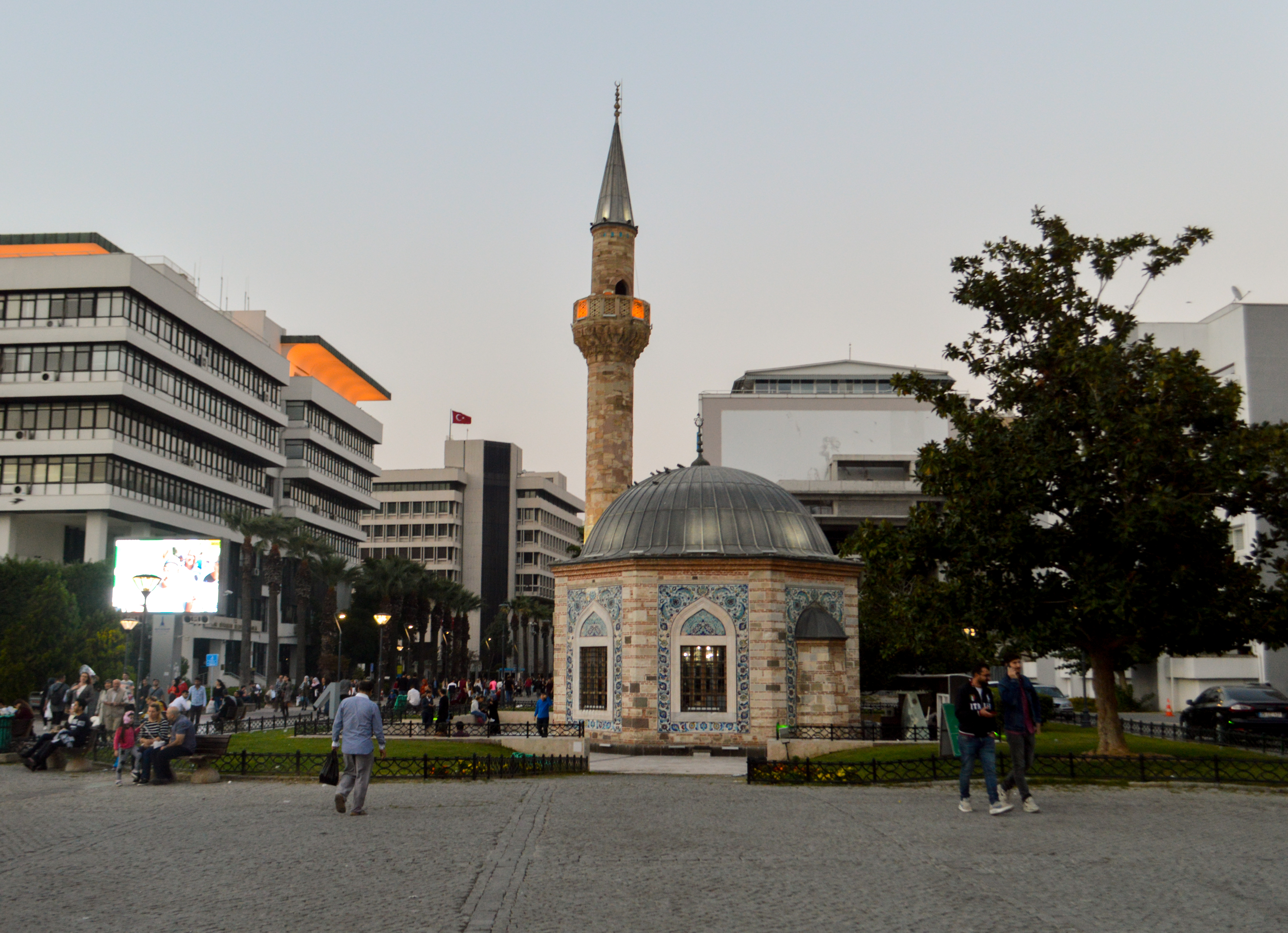
Yalı Mosque and city hall in Konak Square

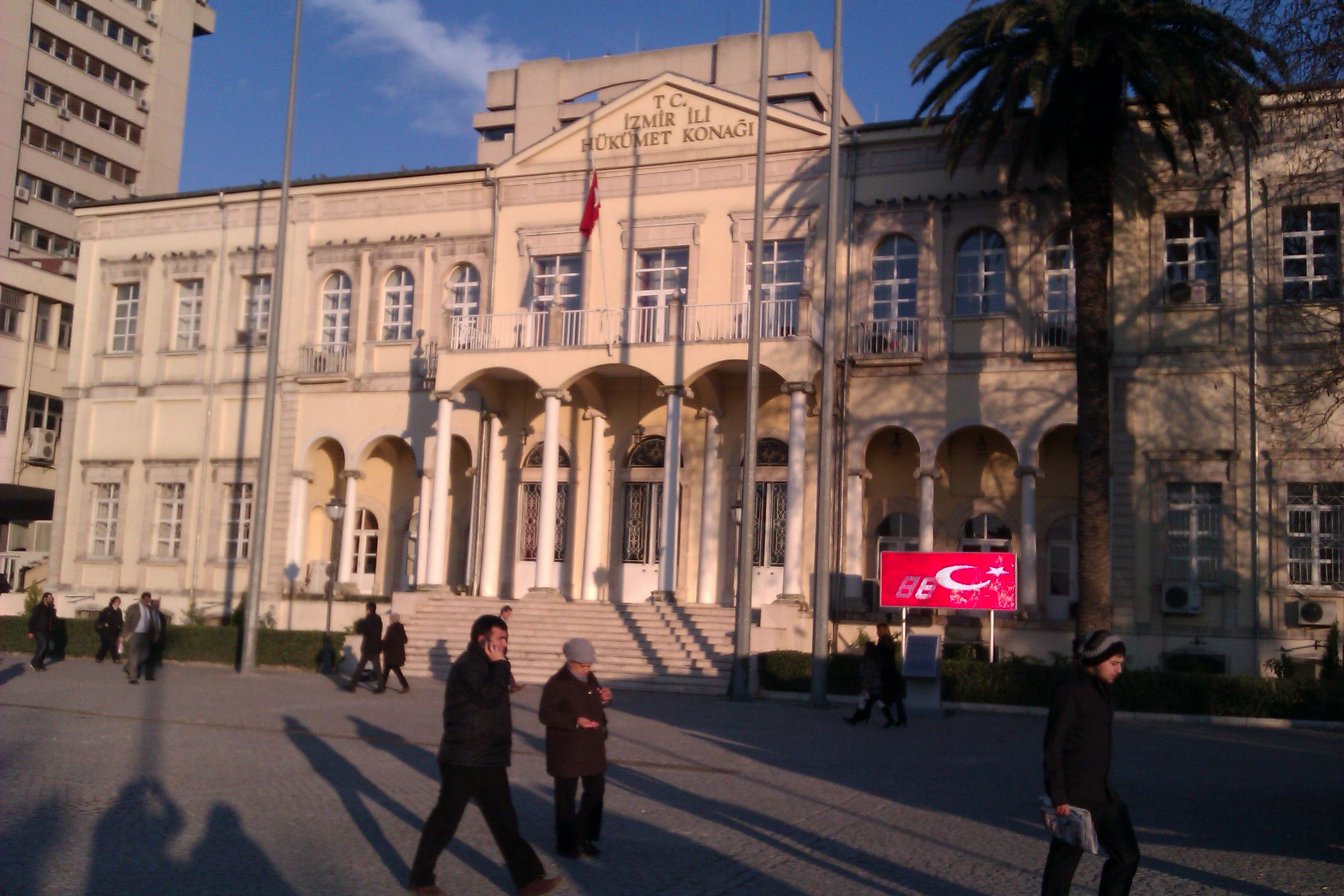
Governorate of İzmir at Konak Square

Most of this busy square is occupied by the Governorate (Governor's Konak) of İzmir Province, the City Hall of İzmir Metropolitan Municipality, the Central Bus Station, and the Yalı Mosque. At the center of the square is the İzmir Clock Tower, an old landmark built in 1901. The square is also near Kemeraltı, İzmir's major market (bazaar) district. At the southern end of the square is the Cultural Centre of Ege University, which includes an opera house, a music academy, and a museum of modern art.

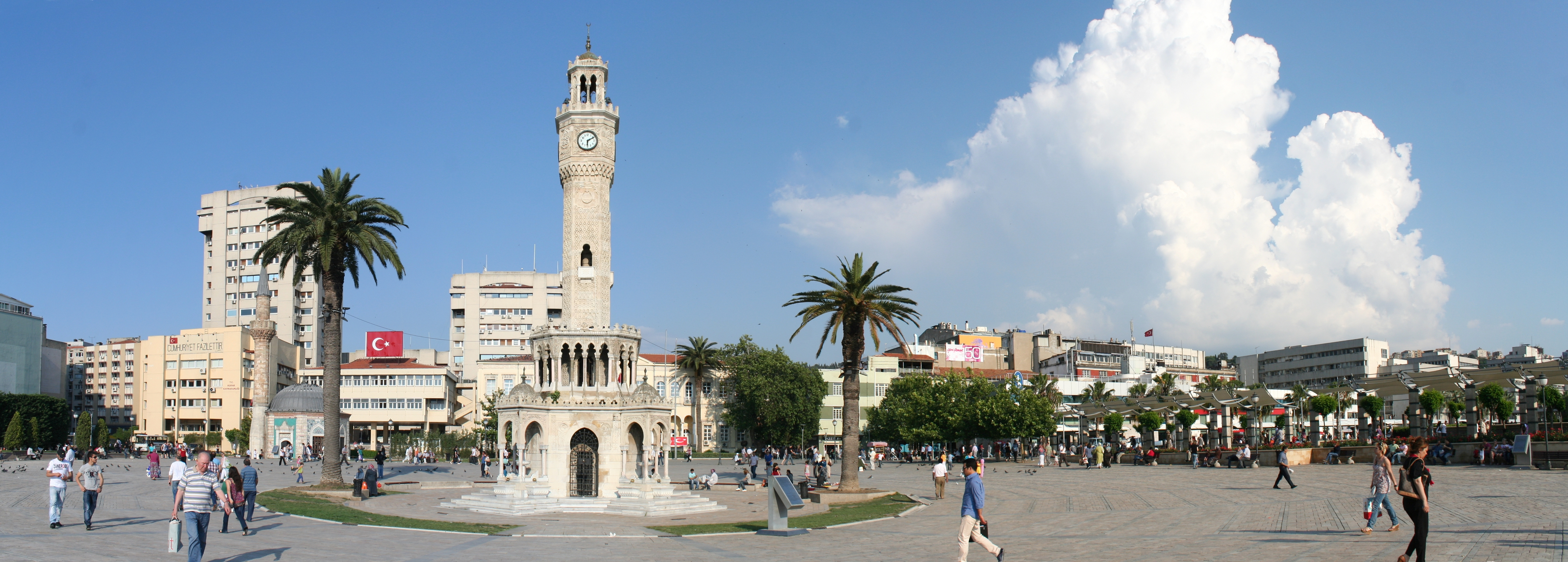
General view of Konak Square with the İzmir Clock Tower

== See also ==
- Cumhuriyet Square
- Konak Terminal

== Resources ==
- Rengin Zengel, Yasemin Sayar Dokuz Eylül University. "Evaluation of Squares in Non-Western Countries: The Case Study of Konak Square, İzmir, Turkey" (PDF). Edge Hill University. Archived from the original (PDF) on 2012-02-14.
