= Lencouacq =

- Commune
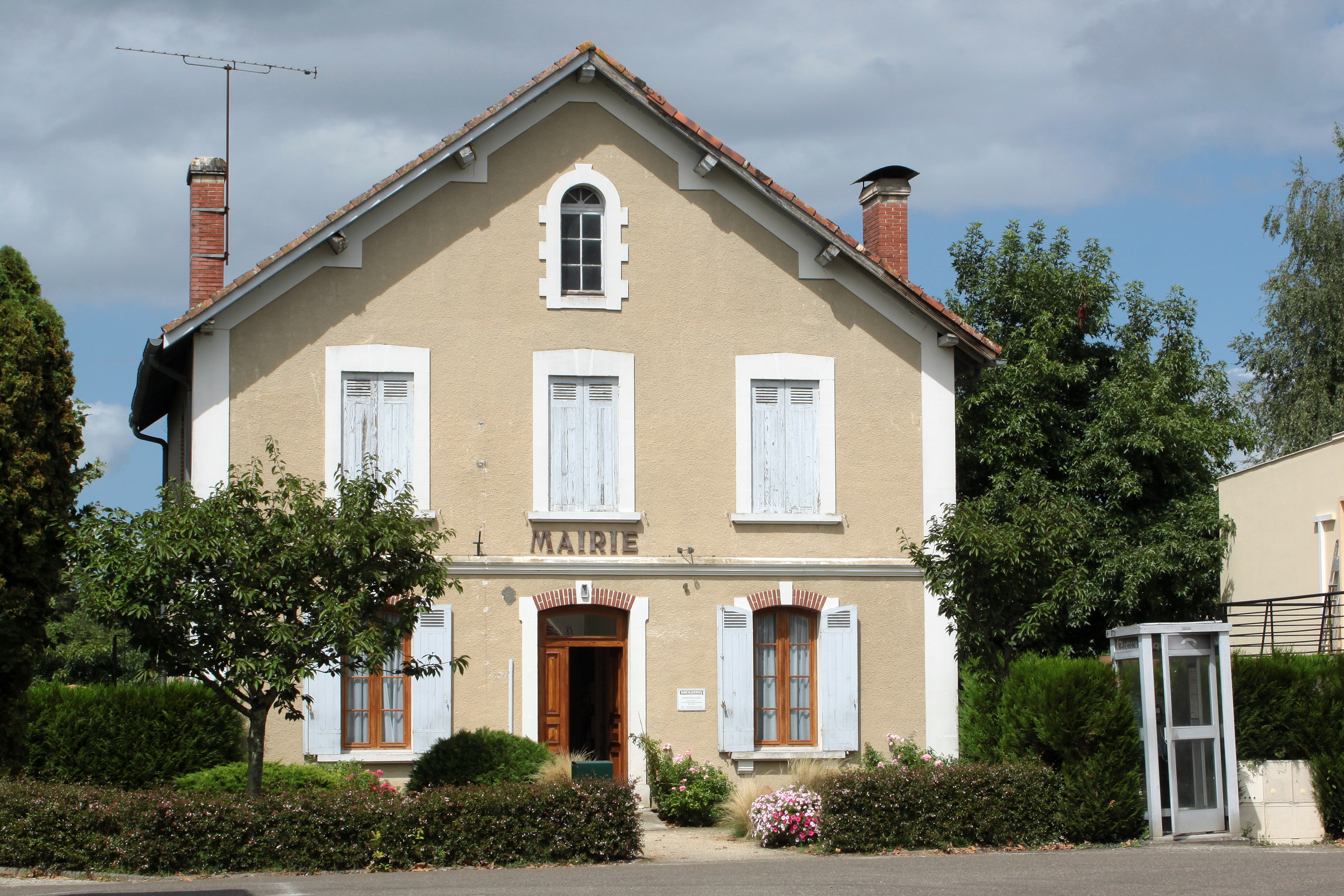
- The town hall in Lencouacq

- Coat of arms
- Location of Lencouacq
- Location within France Location within Nouvelle-Aquitaine
- Coordinates: 44°06′00″N 0°24′12″W
- Country: France
- Region: Nouvelle-Aquitaine
- Department: Landes
- Arrondissement: Mont-de-Marsan
- Canton: Haute Lande Armagnac
- Intercommunality: Landes d'Armagnac

Government
  - Mayor (2025–2026): Olga Mesples
- Area^{1}: 96.62 km^{2} (37.31 sq mi)
- Elevation: 82 m (269 ft)
- Highest elevation: 128 m (420 ft)
- Lowest elevation: 75 m (246 ft)
- Population (2023): 378
  - Density: 3.91/km^{2} (10.1/sq mi)
- Time zone: UTC+01:00 (CET)
  - Summer (DST): UTC+02:00 (CEST)
- INSEE/Postal code: 40149 /40120
- ^{1} French Land Register data, which excludes lakes, ponds, glaciers > 1 km^{2} (0.386 sq mi or 247 acres) and river estuaries.

Lencouacq (French pronunciation: [lɛ̃kwak]; Gascon: Lencoac) is a commune in the Landes department in Nouvelle-Aquitaine in south-western France.

== Transport ==
Between 1907 and 1934, Lencouacq was the terminus of the 12-kilometre (7.5 mi) long 750 mm (2 ft 5 1/2 in) gauge Chemin de fer Économiques Forestiers des Landes railway line from Roquefort.

== See also ==
- Communes of the Landes department
- Parc naturel régional des Landes de Gascogne
