= İzmir Clock Tower =

Clock tower in İzmir, Turkey

- İzmir Saat Kulesi
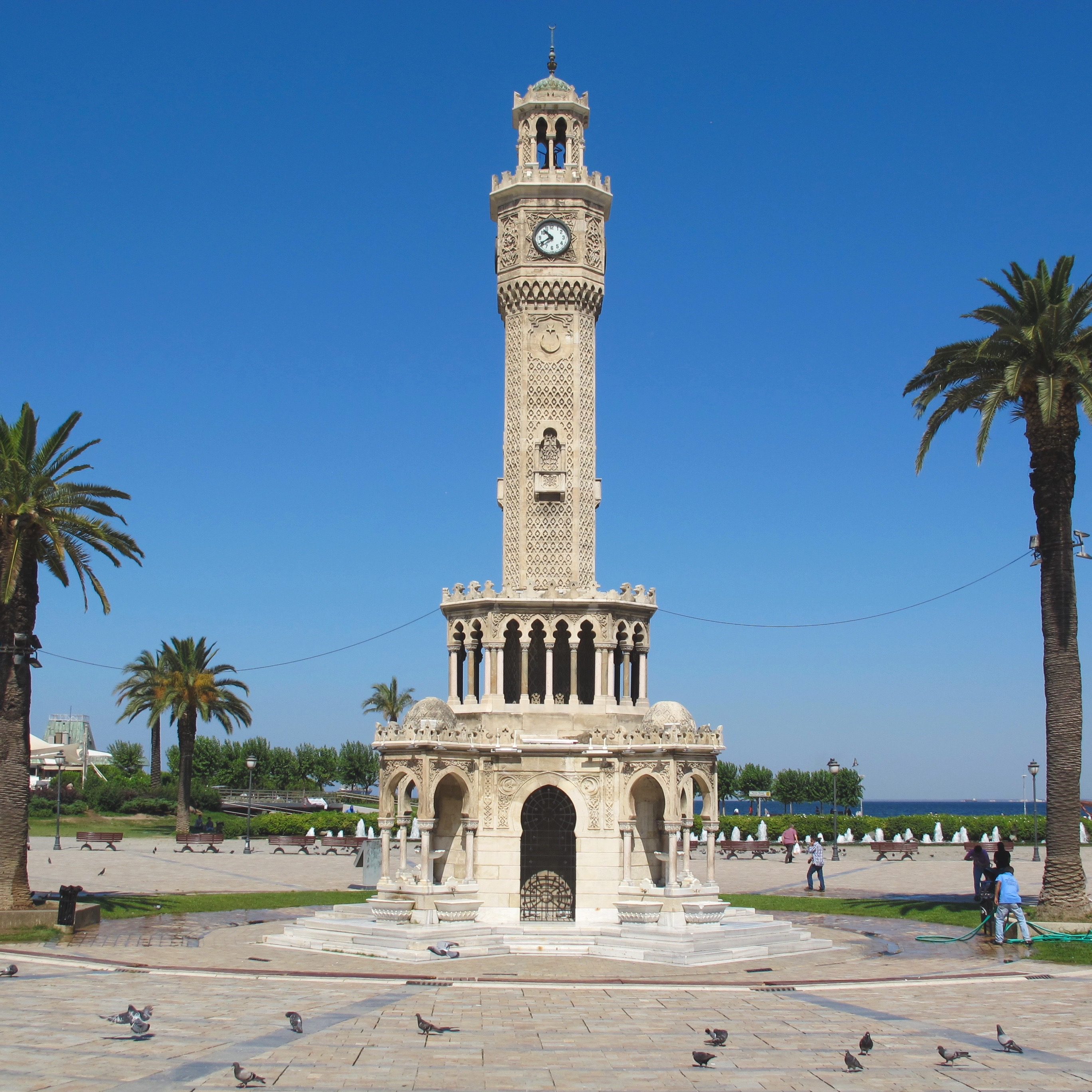
- Interactive map of the İzmir Clock Tower area
- Former names: Hamidiye Tower

General information
- Type: Clock tower
- Architectural style: Ottoman architecture
- Location: Konak Square, İzmir, Turkey
- Coordinates: 38°25′07.9″N 27°07′43.2″E
- Groundbreaking: 1 September 1900
- Completed: August 1901
- Inaugurated: 1 September 1901
- Renovated: 1928, 1974, 2019

Height
- Height: 25 m (82 ft)

Technical details
- Material: Stone, marble
- Floor count: 4
- Grounds: 81 m^{2} (870 sq ft)

Design and construction
- Architect: Raymond Charles Péré

İzmir Clock Tower (Turkish: İzmir Saat Kulesi) is a historic clock tower located at the Konak Square in the Konak district of İzmir, Turkey. It is considered as the main landmark of the city, and is featured on its municipal emblem.

== History ==
Kâmil Pasha, the then-Governor of Aidin Vilayet, held a meeting with the prominent people of İzmir on 1 August 1900. It was decided a clock tower to be built in commemoration of the 25th anniversary of Abdul Hamid II's accession to the throne. The clock tower was designed by the Levantine French architect Raymond Charles Péré. The groundbreaking ceremony of the construction was held on 1 September 1900. The tower was completed in August 1901 and officially inaugurated on 1 September 1901, the 25th anniversary of the sultan's accession to the throne.

The top of the tower was destroyed in a magnitude 6.4 earthquake on 31 March 1928 and again in a magnitude 5.2 earthquake on 1 February 1974. During the protests against the 2016 Turkish coup d'état attempt, the clock of the tower was stolen. The tower underwent restoration in 2019.

== Architecture ==
The tower, which has an iron and lead skeleton, is 25 m (82 ft) high and features four fountains (şadırvan), which are placed around the base in a circular pattern. The ground area of the tower is 81 m^{2} (870 sq ft) The tower has an octagonal plan and four floors. It was made of marble and stone. The tower has four clocks with a diameter of 75 cm. There is a bell on the fourth floor which is carried by twelve columns. There were tughras and Ottoman coats of arms on four sides of the tower. After the proclamation of the republic, they were engraved and replaced with stars and crescents.

== Depictions ==
The clock tower was depicted on the reverse of the Turkish 500 lira banknotes of 1983–1989. It is also featured on the emblem of İzmir Metropolitan Municipality. A 1:25 scale model of the tower is on display in Miniatürk.

== Gallery ==
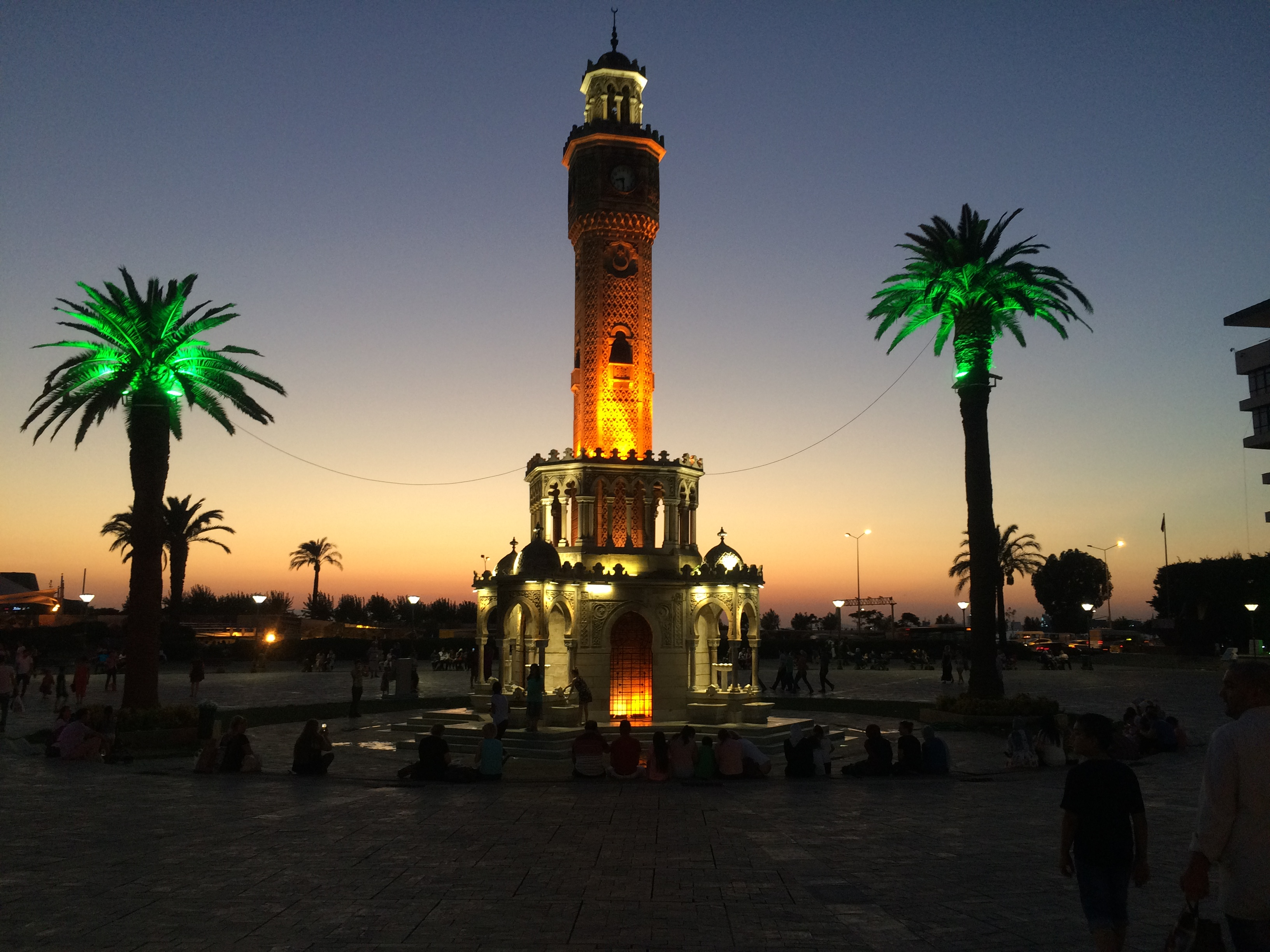
Night-time view of the tower (2017)

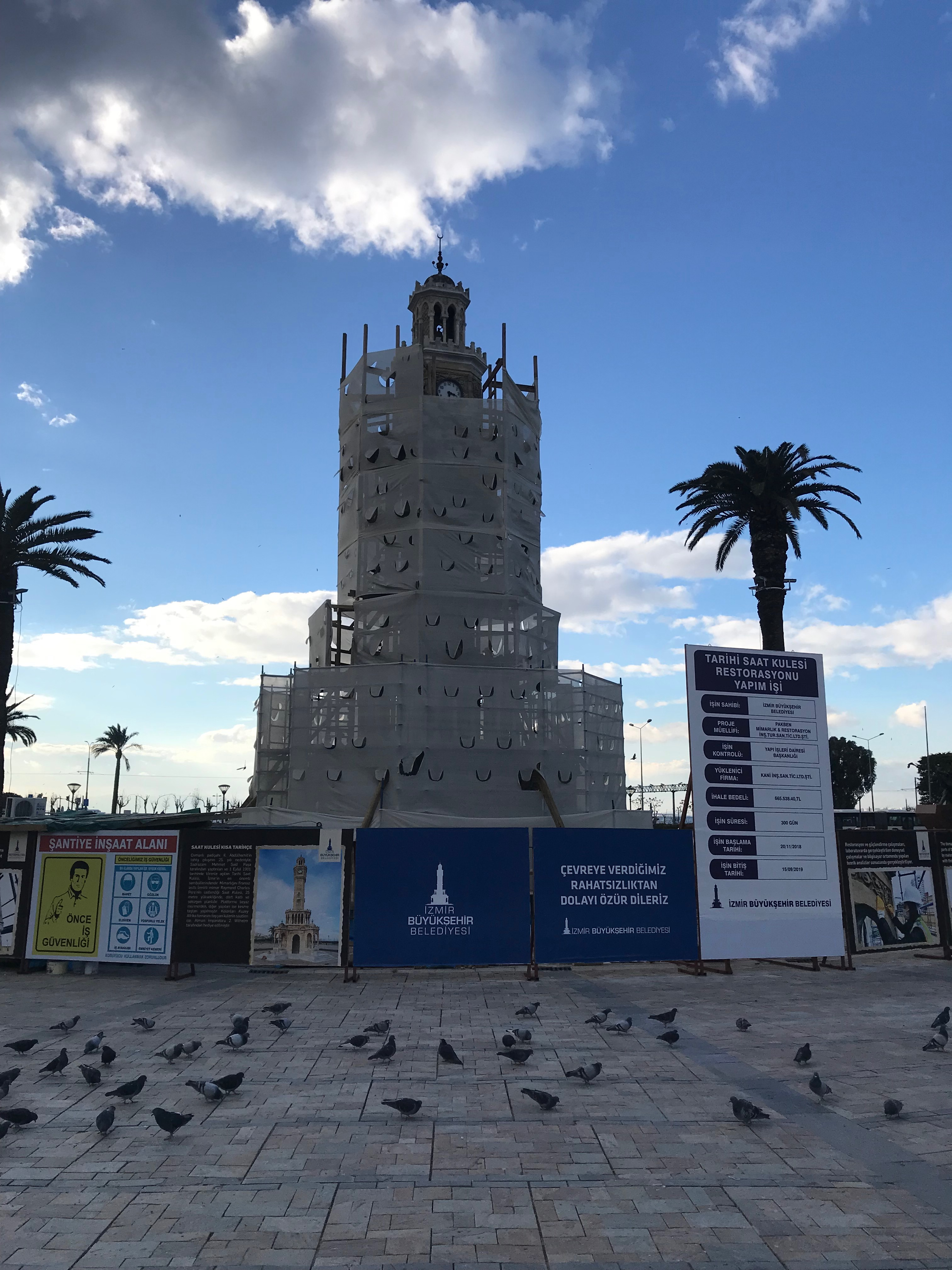
Renovation of the tower (2019)

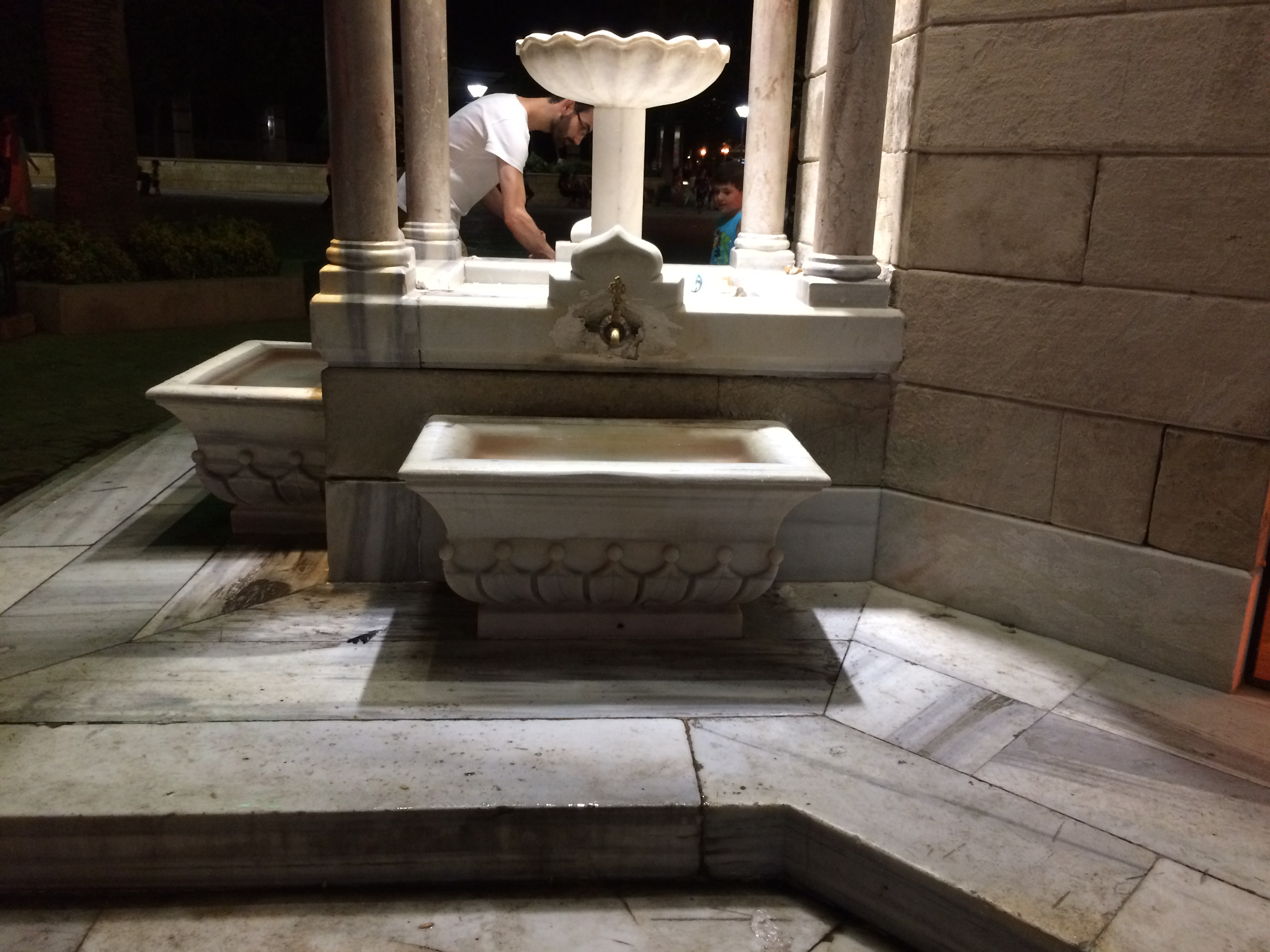
One of the fountains in the tower

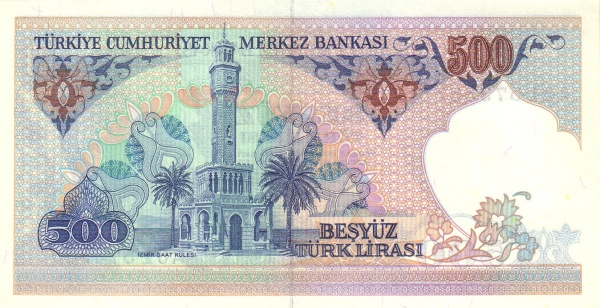
Reverse of the 500 lira banknote (1983–1989)
