= Roquefort, Landes =

Roquefort
- Commune
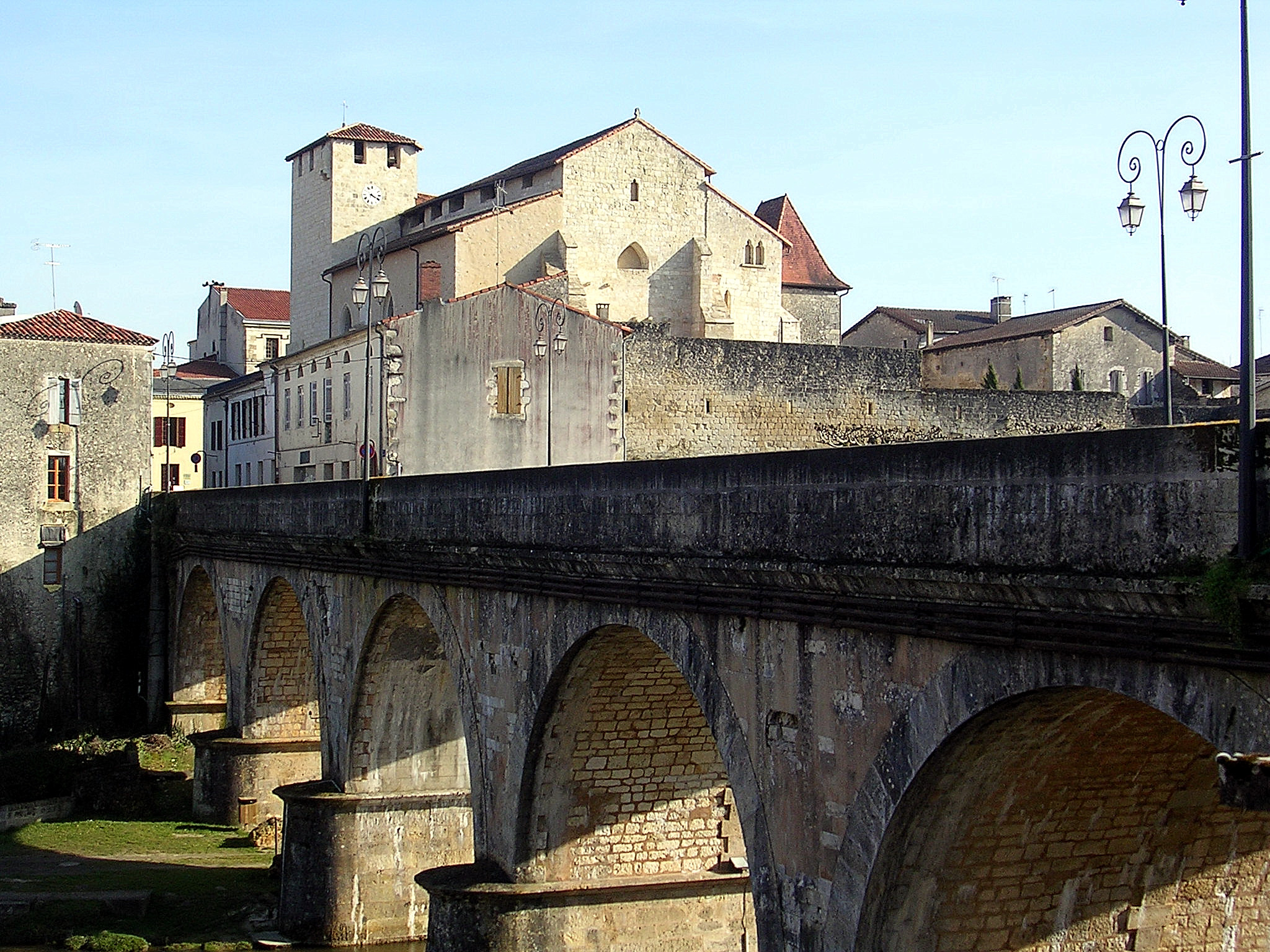
- Church of Our Lady of the Assumption

- Coat of arms
- Location of Roquefort
- Location within France Location within Nouvelle-Aquitaine
- Coordinates: 44°02′03″N 0°19′17″W
- Country: France
- Region: Nouvelle-Aquitaine
- Department: Landes
- Arrondissement: Mont-de-Marsan
- Canton: Haute Lande Armagnac

Government
  - Mayor (2020–2026): François Hubert
- Area^{1}: 12.12 km^{2} (4.68 sq mi)
- Highest elevation: 95 m (312 ft)
- Lowest elevation: 49 m (161 ft)
- Population (2023): 1,990
  - Density: 164/km^{2} (425/sq mi)
- Time zone: UTC+01:00 (CET)
  - Summer (DST): UTC+02:00 (CEST)
- INSEE/Postal code: 40245 /40120
- ^{1} French Land Register data, which excludes lakes, ponds, glaciers > 1 km^{2} (0.386 sq mi or 247 acres) and river estuaries.

Roquefort (French pronunciation: [ʁɔkfɔʁ]; Occitan: Ròcahòrt) is a commune in the Landes department in Nouvelle-Aquitaine in southwestern France.

== Population ==
Historical population
| Year | Pop. | ±% p.a. |
|---|---|---|
| 1968 | 2,170 | — |
| 1975 | 2,112 | −0.39% |
| 1982 | 1,828 | −2.04% |
| 1990 | 1,821 | −0.05% |
| 1999 | 1,894 | +0.44% |
| 2007 | 1,912 | +0.12% |
| 2012 | 1,876 | −0.38% |
| 2017 | 1,892 | +0.17% |
| 2023 | 1,990 | +0.85% |
Source: INSEE

== Transport ==
Between 1907 and 1934, Roquefort was the terminus of the 12-kilometre (7.5 mi) long 750 mm (2 ft 5 1/2 in) gauge Chemin de fer Économiques Forestiers des Landes railway line from Lencouacq. Roquefort station provided an interchange with the Marmande to Mont-de-Marsan railway line of the Chemin de Fer du Midi.

== See also ==
- Communes of the Landes department
