= Walton Bridge =

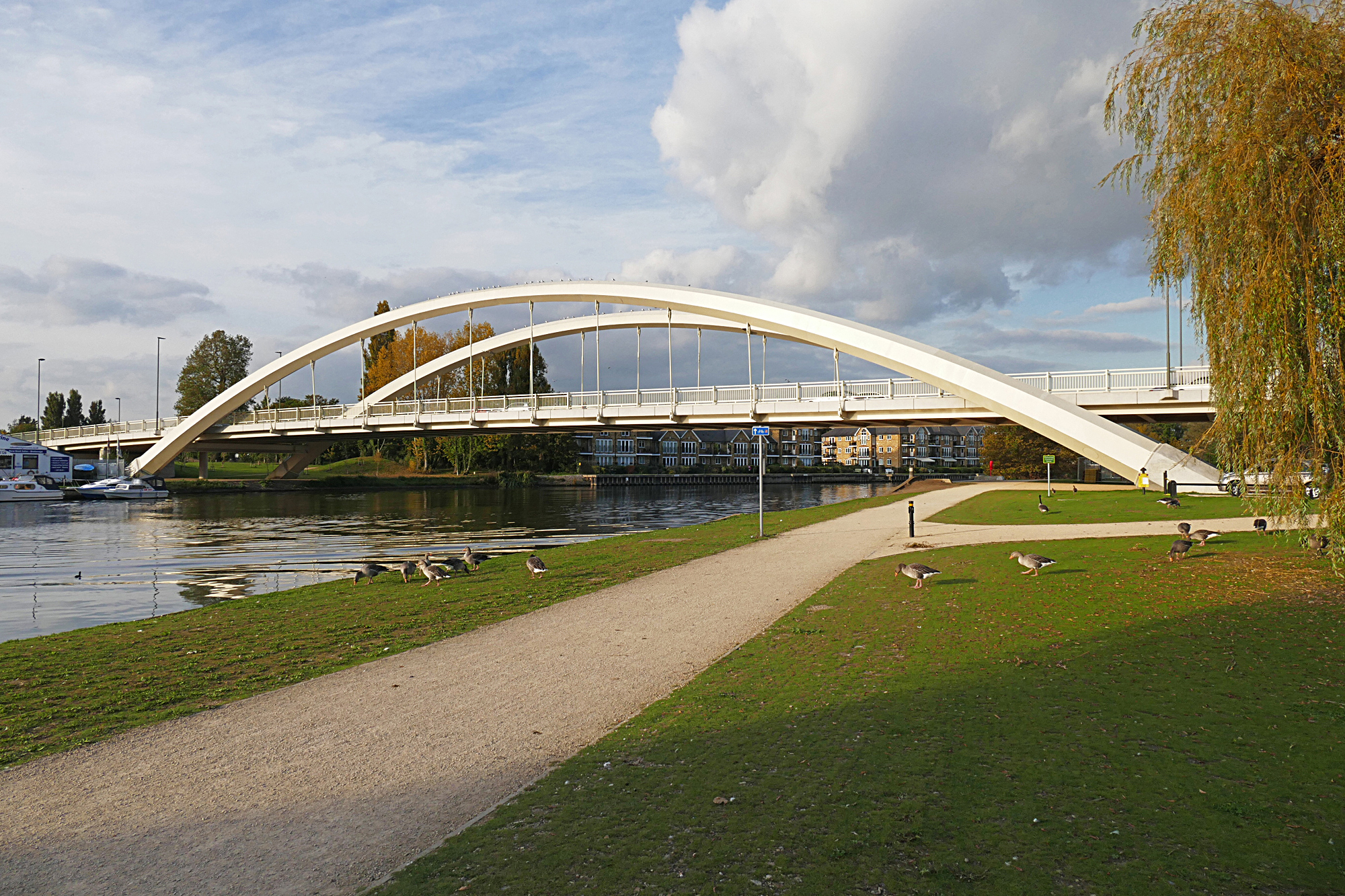
- Walton Bridge (taken in October 2015 from upstream)
- Coordinates: 51°23′15″N 0°25′52″W
- Carries: A224 road
- Crosses: River Thames
- Locale: Walton on Thames and Shepperton, Surrey
- Maintained by: Surrey County Council

Characteristics
- Material: Steel
- Height: 18 feet 3 inches (5.56 m)

History
- Opened: 2013

Statistics
- Toll: Abolished 1870

Location
- Interactive map of Walton Bridge

Walton Bridge is a road bridge across the River Thames in England, carrying the A244 between Walton-on-Thames and Shepperton, crossing the Thames on the reach between Sunbury Lock and Shepperton Lock.

The bridge is the first Thames road bridge which is on both banks upstream of Greater London. The bridge is the sixth on the site. Before the first bridge, the site had a ferry dating at least to the 17th century.

== Earlier crossings at the site ==
Near Walton Bridge, and removed when the first bridge was built in 1750, were several barrows. Spearheads and earthenware vessels are said by James Douglas to have been found in them.

From Elmbridge ferries run by operators under a Crown-granted monopoly, subject to conditions, existed since the Stuart period:

| Hampton Court, Hampton | Molesey – see Hampton Court Bridge |
| Hampton | Molesey Hurst – still operational, established 1514 |
| Sunbury-on-Thames | Sunbury Lock – at the north-eastern corner of Walton-on-Thames – discontinued |
| Lower Halliford, Shepperton | Walton-on-Thames – now Walton Bridge |
| Old Shepperton, Shepperton | Weybridge – still operational |

The two remaining join those in London (the Twickenham Ferry and Woolwich Ferry) and seasonal visitor services in Oxford.

Land near the relevant site was said in 1633 to have been washed away, reflecting the lack of the additional river channels at Windsor, Laleham and Weybridge, lack of weirs and former marshiness of the double bend of the river known as Cowey Sale and opposing small meander of land, Thames Meadow on the north bank.

A Shepperton ferry is recorded in the 15th century – at which position however is uncertain.

== First bridge ==
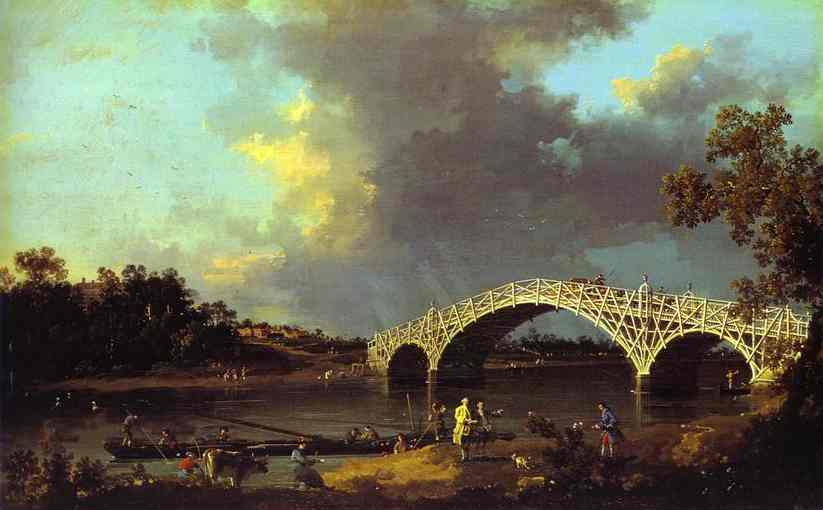
First Bridge — Walton Bridge by Canaletto

In 1747 Samuel Dicker, local landowner and later MP for Plymouth, obtained permission to build a bridge at Walton. It was designed by William Etheridge and built by White of Weybridge to consist of "timbers tangent to a circle of 100 feet diameter" and was built so that a single timber could be extracted and repaired without disturbing the rest of the bridge. Old Walton Bridge was completed in August 1750 and acquired some fame, meriting an article in The Gentleman's Magazine, a report in Daniel Defoe's Tour in 1753 and a painting by Canaletto in 1754. The painting, which shows the rococo-style of this bridge, is in Dulwich Picture Gallery.

Queens' College, Cambridge record that its Mathematical Bridge resembles this much grander structure also by Etheridge — unlike Walton Bridge, Etheridge's bridge there has been rebuilt twice to his design, having encountered minor wood rot, but has never collapsed.

The timber structure stood approximately 33 years, that is, until 1783. A report on the condition of the bridge in 1778 suggested that decay in the wooden frame made it unsuitable for use and it was dismantled five years later.

== Second bridge ==
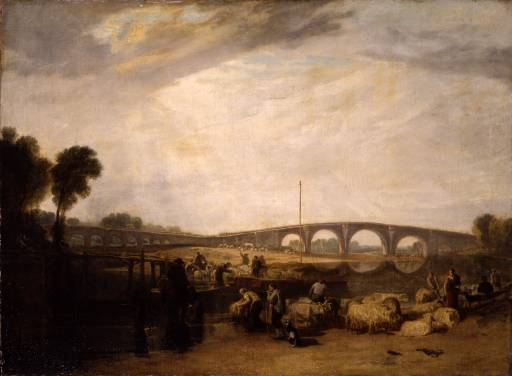
Second Bridge — Walton Bridges by J. M. W. Turner

The second bridge made of stone (and internally of brick) was permitted, with additional tolls, under the Walton-Shepperton Bridge (Rebuilding and Tolls) Act 1780 (20 Geo. 3. c. 32) obtained by the nephew of Mr. Dicker, Dicker Sanders and designed by James Paine, whose bridge Chertsey Bridge still stands. This was opened in 1788. This bridge inspired three paintings by Turner in 1805 of different scenes featuring the bridge following some sketches which have also been preserved; most of these works are kept by the Tate Gallery, though one painting was sold at Sotheby's in July 2018 for £3.4 million, its export then being blocked by the government for the national benefit. Most of Turner's river tour of 1805 concentrated on the Thames, with a few paintings of the Wey at that time.

The bridge lasted much longer than its predecessor, but part of it collapsed in 1859. A ferry crossing was briefly revived until the completion of the third bridge in 1864.

== Third bridge ==
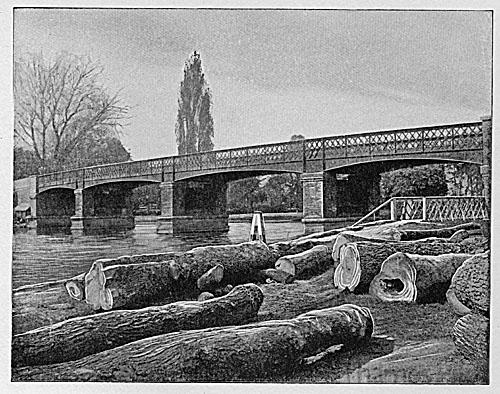
Third Bridge — James Dredge

The third bridge, built 1863–64, was an iron girder lattice bridge on stone piers. At the same time, a brick viaduct was constructed to span the flood plain to the south of the river. The bridge was freed of tolls in 1870 under the Kew and Other Bridges Act 1869 (32 & 33 Vict. c. xix).

The third bridge was damaged during the Second World War in 1940 leading to a permanent weight restriction. To alleviate this a fourth temporary bridge was constructed and the third bridge was relegated to use by cyclists and pedestrians. Robbins described it in 1953 as "an ungracious structure of iron lattice girders" in his county history. Assisted by the weight restriction and metal design it was longer-lasting than the previous two bridges but was finally demolished in 1985.

== Fourth bridge ==
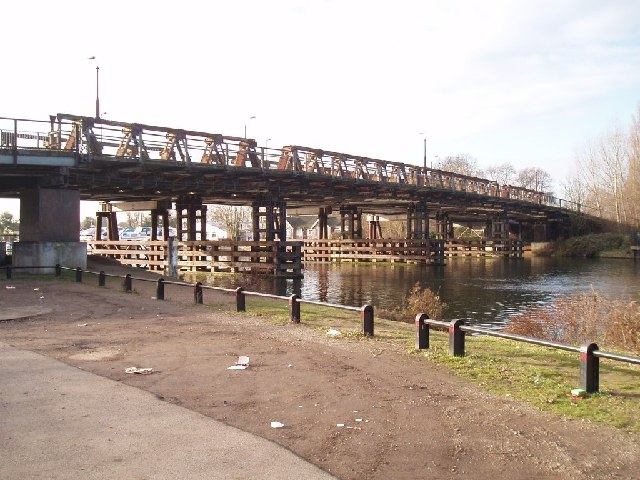
Fourth Walton Bridge from downstream

The fourth bridge was constructed in 1953 on the downstream side of the old bridge, using a truss construction designed by A. M. Hamilton in 1930 and is called a Callender-Hamilton bridge. The fourth bridge was retained for use by cyclists and pedestrians when the fifth bridge was completed in 1999.

== Fifth bridge ==
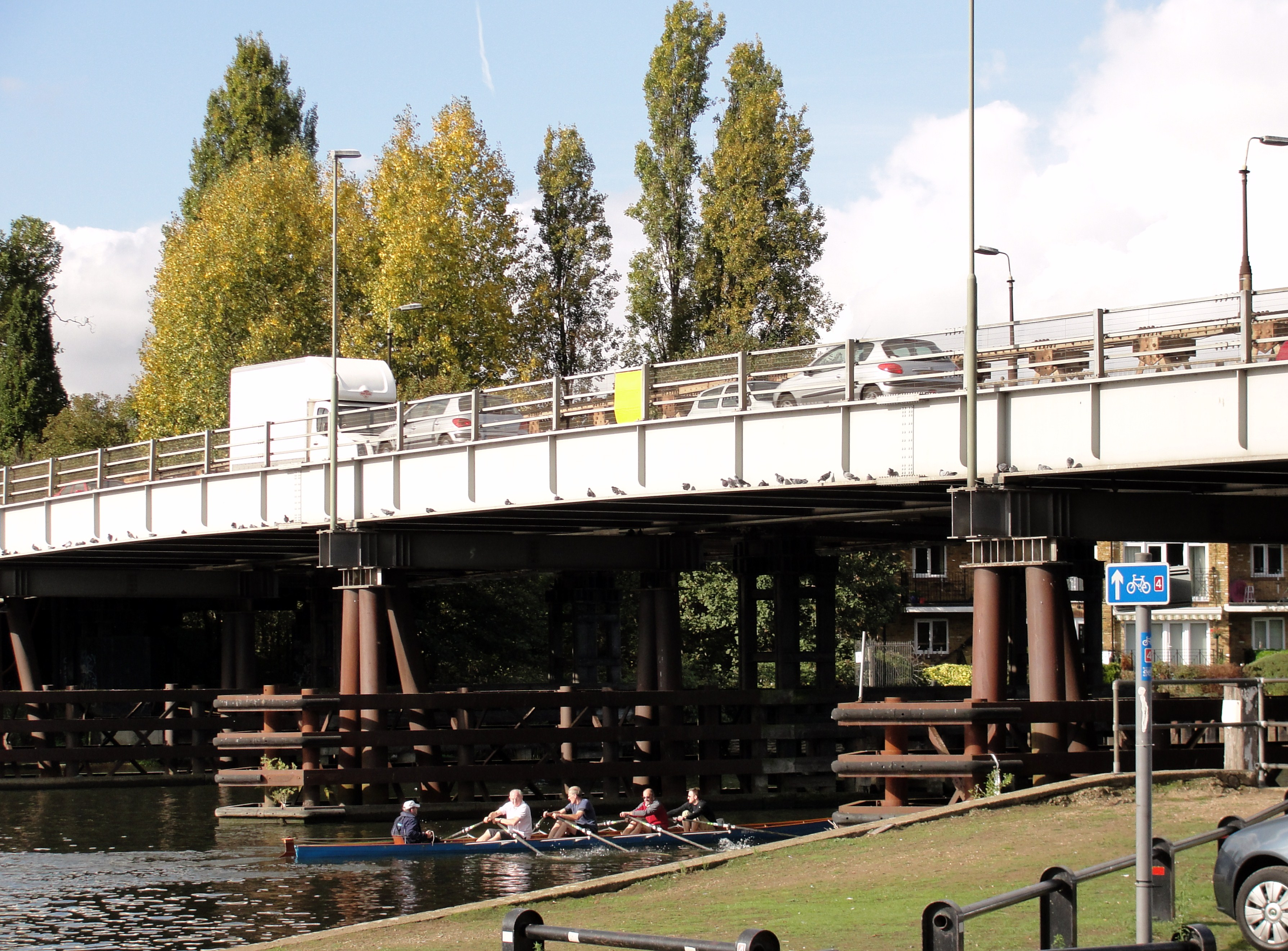
Fifth Walton Bridge

In 1999, while the fourth bridge remained standing for use by pedestrians and cyclists, another temporary structure, the fifth bridge, on the site of the original bridges, was opened for vehicular traffic. It was authorised by the Surrey County Council (New Temporary Road Bridge, Walton) Scheme 1998 Confirmation Instrument 1999 (SI 1999/2058). This initially had several problems and had to be resurfaced a number of times causing traffic disruptions. The poor architecture of these two co-existing bridges led to demands for construction of the sixth bridge (pictured). Together, the old bridges faced heavy criticism as had the very existence of a rusting, less strong, incongruous, military style foot and cycle bridge and engineers predicted structural weakness by 2015, hence the plans for a new bridge. In 2003 a political impetus grew for rebuilding and was a key local election issue for councillors seeking to run for Elmbridge Borough Council and Surrey County Council combined with the Heart of Walton Development which was not yet complete.

== Sixth bridge ==
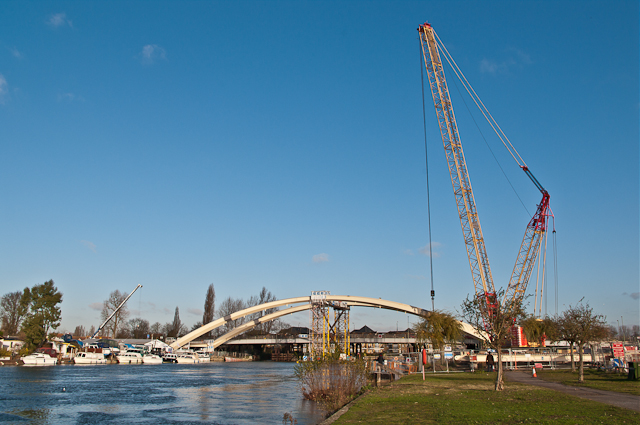
The sixth bridge during construction in December 2012

The sixth bridge was opened on 22 July 2013. A public inquiry rejected some aspects of the original plan but approval of the funding arrangements was confirmed on 29 December 2010. After extensive preparatory work in 2011, the main construction works began on 9 January 2012, and building completed in July 2013. The bridge replaced the two extant bridges (4th and 5th), which remained in use during construction. The new £32.4 million bridge has no piers in the river, thus opening up views along the river and improving navigation for boats. The constructor completed the removal of the old bridges in November 2013 and was set to complete surrounding landscaping works in August 2014.

The bridge is used on an unsigned but map-marked cyclists' variation of the Thames Path bypassing the on-request Shepperton to Weybridge Ferry, that runs during main hours of daytime, to where the path recombines at Chertsey Bridge, where it takes the northern towpath as below Hampton Court Bridge.

The bridge, a thrust arch bridge, provides the first single-span bridge heading up the Thames. The next single-span bridges up the Thames are a pair of co-functional "old and new" Runnymede Bridges between Surrey and Berkshire.

== See also ==
- Crossings of the River Thames

== Sources ==
- "Town Populations" (PDF). 2001 census. Archived from the original (pdf) on 25 October 2007.
- Colin Bentley. "History of Walton Bridge". Surrey County Council online. Surrey County Council. Archived from the original on 29 June 2013.

| Next crossing upstream | River Thames | Next crossing downstream |
| Shepperton to Weybridge Ferry (pedestrian) | Walton Bridge | Hampton Ferry (pedestrian) |
