= 1749 in architecture =

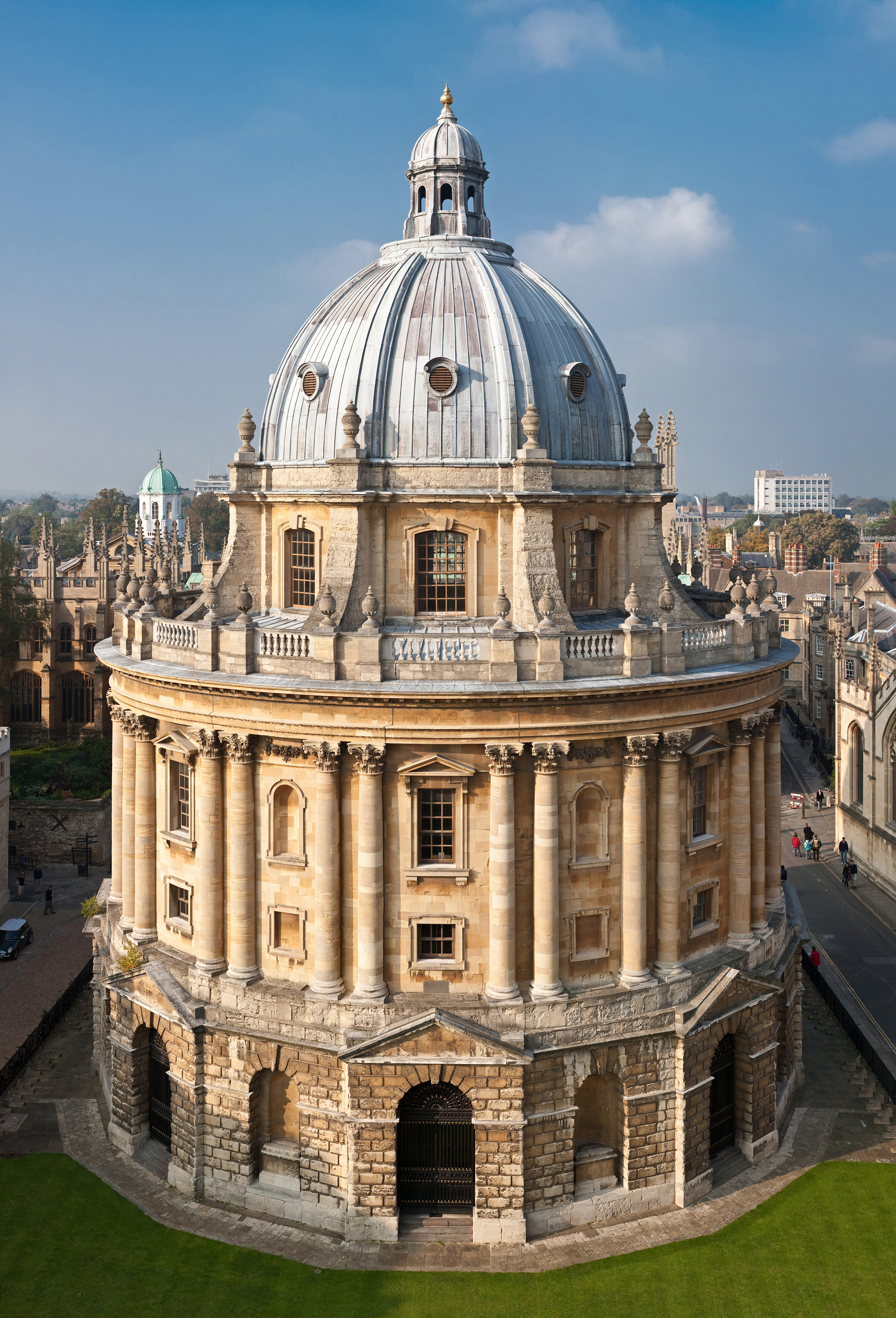
Radcliffe Library, Oxford

== Buildings and structures ==
=== Buildings ===
- April 12 – The Radcliffe Camera in Oxford, England, designed by James Gibbs, is opened as a library.
- Mathematical Bridge at Queens' College, Cambridge, England, designed by William Etheridge, is built by James Essex.
- La Vieille Charité almshouses in Marseille completed to the designs of Pierre Puget.
- Work begins on King's Chapel, in Boston, Massachusetts, designed by Peter Harrison.
- Work begins on Reales Astilleros de Esteiro in Ferrol, Spain.

== Births ==
- June 9 – Andreas Kirkerup, Danish architect (died 1810)
- Louis Montoyer, Austrian Netherlands architect (died 1811)
- Angelo Venturoli, Italian architect (died 1821)

== Deaths ==
- January 9 – Henry Herbert, 9th Earl of Pembroke, English courtier and architect (born 1693)
- January 31 – Roger Morris, English architect (born 1695)
