= Old Walton Bridge =

Former bridge over the River Thames

Coordinates: 51.3875°N 0.4312°W

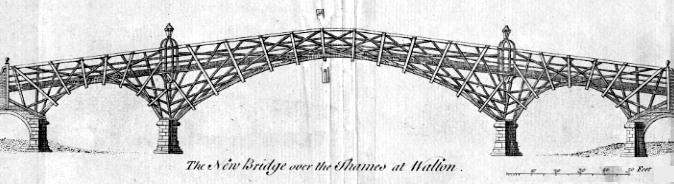
The bridge depicted in a review of 1750

Old Walton Bridge is the name given to the first Walton Bridge built across the River Thames between Walton-on-Thames and Shepperton in Surrey, England (the latter then in Middlesex). The wooden bridge was completed in 1750, was painted by Canaletto and stood until 1783 when, in decay, it was dismantled to make way for a stone-clad brickwork replacement, later painted by J. M. W. Turner.

== History ==
Construction of the bridge by a Mr White of Weybridge was started in 1748 and was completed in 1750. The construction was paid for by Samuel Dicker who was the MP for Plymouth. Dicker had obtained the Walton-Shepperton Bridge (Building and Tolls) Act 1746 (20 Geo. 2. c. 22) and owned property in Walton on Thames. By paying for its construction Dicker also obtained the right to collect tolls from users of the bridge under the statute. Opponents to its construction comprised ferry operators, who foresaw an impact their livelihoods; the bargees who thought it would make the river unnavigable; and a minority of residents of Walton-on-Thames who were worried about an influx of undesirable elements from substantially rural and wayfaring villages of West Middlesex north of the river. Despite the late opposition following his act of Parliament, Dicker pressed on with construction, probably motivated by his own desire for easy access to London (Hampton Court Bridge allowing the shortcut from the south bank across Hampton Court Park's major meander was opened at the end of 1753) and for the financial benefits the tolls would bring.

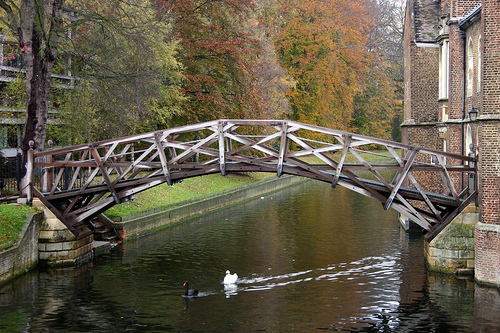
Etheridge's Mathematical Bridge in Cambridge.

The design of the bridge was by William Etheridge who also designed the smaller but similar Mathematical Bridge across the River Cam at Queens' College, Cambridge, and had been responsible for the construction of many of the timber centres of the Westminster Bridge while working as James King's foreman. First constructed between 1749 and 1750, this bridge still stands, although it has been rebuilt twice, most recently in 1905. The Old Walton Bridge was supported by four central stone piers connected by three arches built of wooden beams and joists. The span of the central arch was 130 feet (39 m), at the time the widest unsupported span in England (it was surpassed by William Edwards Bridge at Pontypridd). The other two main arches were each 44 feet (13 m), though Dicker later suggested that the design would have allowed for side spans of 70 ft or more. Away from the water were five further small brickwork arches on each side of the river. On the strength of their success with Walton Bridge Etheridge and Dicker put forward two proposals for a bridge at Blackfriars, one for building in stone and the other in timber. The stone-built proposal was accepted but several changes to Etheridge's design led to him leaving the project before it was completed.

Although considered an impressive feat of engineering at the time of its construction, the bridge stood for only 33 years. Dicker died in London in 1760 and his estates in the area were sold. The bridge passed to his nephew, Michael Dicker Sanders, but he found it difficult to meet the costs of its upkeep. A report on the condition of the bridge in 1778 suggested that decay in the wooden frame made it unsuitable for use, and it was dismantled in 1783 to make way for a stone-clad brickwork bridge which was completed in 1788 and eventually collapsed in 1859 (71 years).

== Canaletto's paintings ==
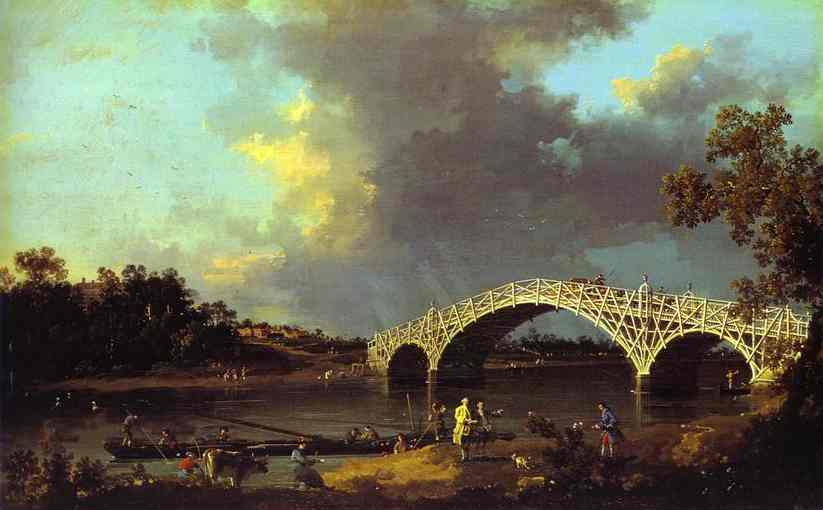
Old Walton Bridge (1754) Canaletto Oil-on-canvas Dulwich Picture Gallery, London

Canaletto spent time in England between 1746 and 1755, mostly in London, but at some time after 1750 he travelled out to Walton to produce a painting of the bridge. He had previously depicted one of Etherbridge's constructions in 1747 as the framing span of The City Seen Through an Arch of Westminster Bridge. Normally the figures populating his landscapes were anonymous, but his painting of the bridge is unusual because the identities of several of the figures are known. In the centre of the painting on the near bank, two figures can be seen standing together; to the left is Thomas Hollis who commissioned the painting from Canaletto, and almost certainly requested that he be included. It is likely that Hollis selected the image from a sketch in Canaletto's portfolio, as the painting omits the stone abutments that were added in 1751. To Hollis' right is Thomas Brand, his lifelong friend and heir. Further to the right, dressed in colourful livery, is Hollis' servant, Francesco Giovannini, and at the feet of Hollis is his dog, Malta. Seated a little distance from the central group on the left (with a cow looking over his shoulder) is an artist thought to be Canaletto himself. In the river a ship is lowering its sail in order to pass under the bridge. With the towering storm clouds forming above the bridge, Canaletto contrasts the forces of nature with the work of engineering below; the painting is the only one of his English works in which he attempts to capture the weather.

Samuel Dicker's house at Mount Felix can be seen in the rear of the picture to the left of the bridge, but Dicker — probably after seeing Hollis's painting — commissioned a different view of the bridge from Canaletto in 1755 in which his house can be seen more clearly and the full extent of the bridge works that he had funded (including the extensive stone abutments) is obvious.

The painting is normally kept by the Dulwich Picture Gallery.

== Bibliography ==
- Skempton, A. W. (2002). A Biographical Dictionary of Civil Engineers in Great Britain and Ireland. Thomas Telford. p. 784. ISBN 072772939X.
- Tilly, Graham (2002). Conservation of Bridges: A Guide to Good Practice. Spon Press. p. 416. ISBN 0419259104.
- "Old Walton Bridge". BBC. 2007. Archived from the original on 11 December 2006.
- "Old Walton Bridge". Queens' College Cambridge. Archived from the original on 16 March 2007.
- Emil Kren and Daniel Marx. "Canaletto: Old Walton Bridge". Web Gallery of Art.
- Colin Bentley (2007). "Walton Bridge - The first bridge". Surrey County Council. Archived from the original on 16 March 2007.
