= Shepperton Ferry =

Shepperton Ferry may refer to:

- SS Shepperton Ferry, a train ferry that ran from Dover to Calais between 1935 and 1972
- The Shepperton to Weybridge Ferry, a pedestrian and cycle ferry across the River Thames between Shepperton and Weybridge
