= A View of Walton Bridge =

1754 Painting by Canaletto

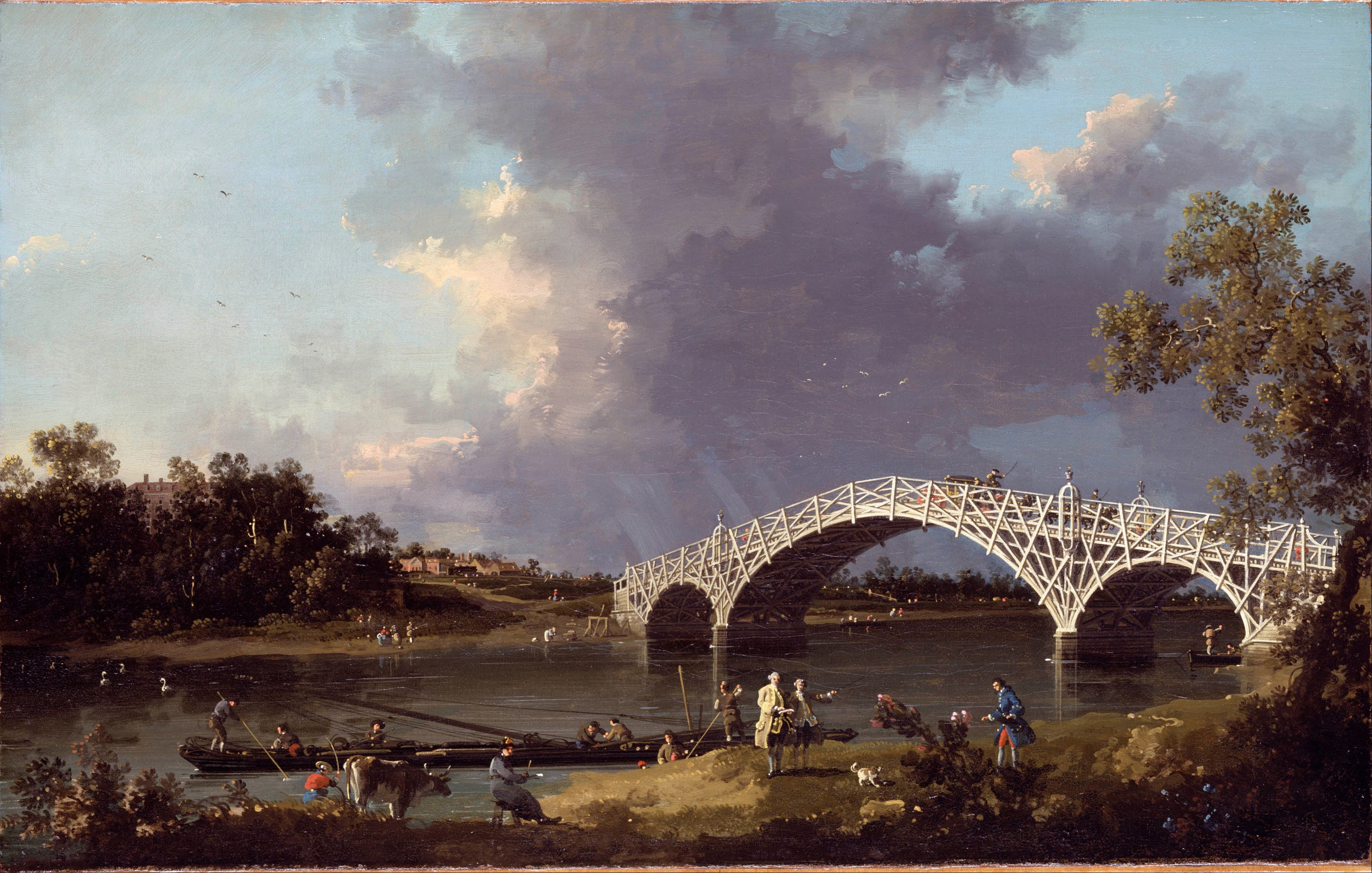
- Artist: Canaletto
- Year: 1754
- Type: Oil on canvas
- Dimensions: 48.7 cm × 76.4 cm (19.2 in × 30.1 in)
- Location: Dulwich Picture Gallery; London

A View of Walton Bridge is a 1754 landscape painting by the Italian artist Canaletto depicting the construction of a new bridge at Walton, Surrey on the Thames southwest of London, now known as Old Walton Bridge.

Canaletto had become famous for his depictions of his native Venice but in 1746 had journeyed to England to be closer to the wealthy British patrons he had worked for in Italy. Many of his commissions involved great houses and the public buildings of the capital. He also painted several views of the newly constructed Westminster Bridge. The eighteenth century saw a flurry of new bridges to supplement the few crossings of the river. Plans for a bridge at Walton to replace the historic ferry saw work begin in 1748 to designs by the architect and engineer William Etheridge. It was completed in 1750.

The painting was one of five works commissioned by Thomas Hollis (1720–1774). Canaletto has added a self-portrait and is shown in the foreground sketching the scene. The bridge depicted was replaced in 1788 by a more substantial stone bridge which was then painted by the English artist Turner in his Walton Bridges of 1806. Canaletto's depiction is today part in the collection of the Dulwich Picture Gallery in London.

== Bibliography ==
- Kowalczyk, Bożena Anna . Canaletto, 1697–1768. Silvana Editoriale, 2018.
- Sheriff, Mary D. Cultural Contact and the Making of European Art since the Age of Exploration. University of North Carolina Press, 2010.
- Sweetman, John. The Artist and the Bridge: 1700–1920. Routledge, 2019.
- Uzanne, Octave. Canaletto. Parkstone International, 2023.
- Wilson, Simon. British Art: From Holbein to the Present Day. Tate Gallery, 1979.

== See also ==
- List of paintings by Canaletto
