= Shepperton to Weybridge Ferry =

Ferry across the River Thames in South East England

Coordinates: 51.3824°N 0.4568°W

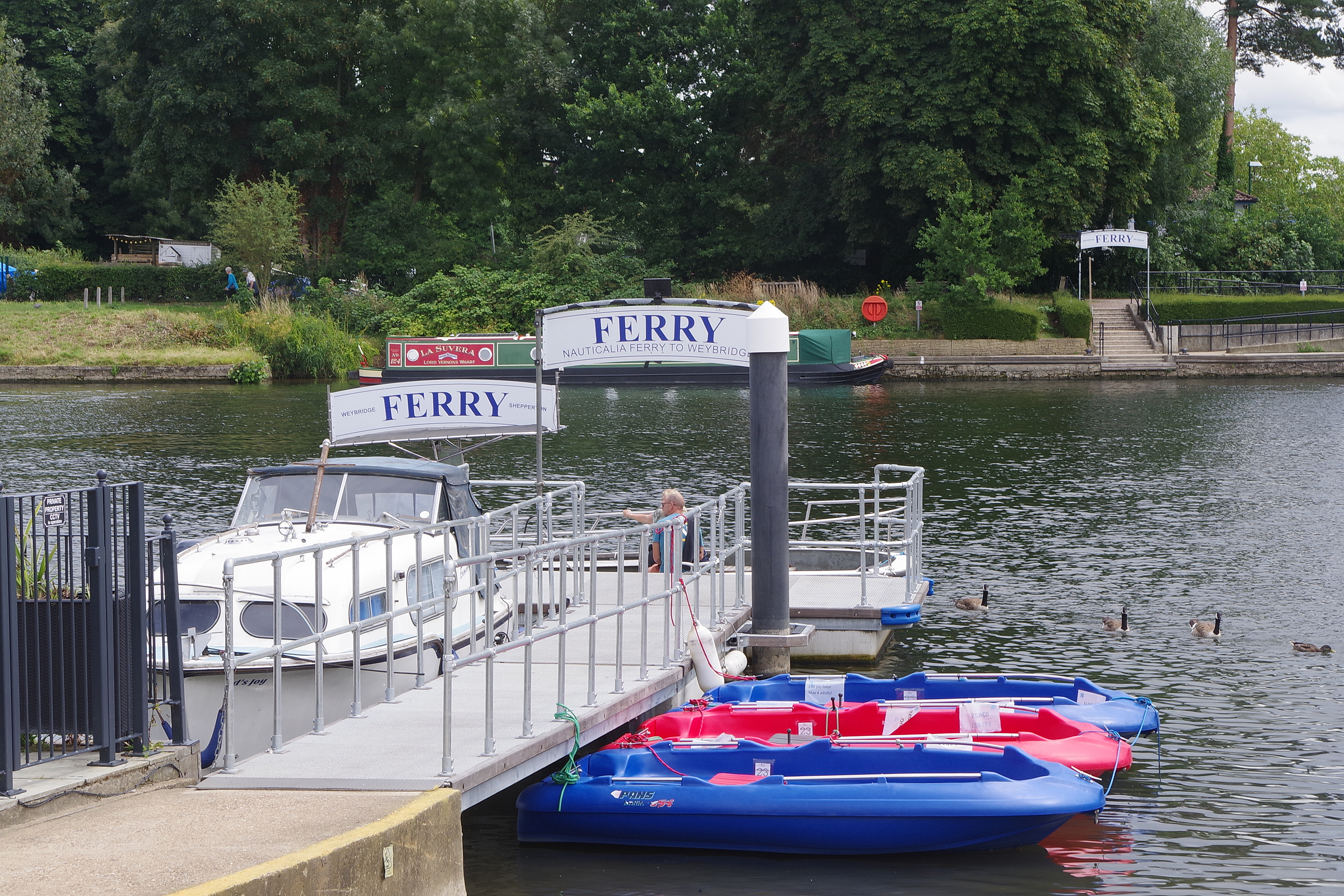
- The northern terminus with the southern terminus in the distance
- Locale: Surrey, South East England
- Waterway: River Thames
- Transit type: Passenger and cycle ferry
- Operator: Nauticalia

The Shepperton to Weybridge Ferry is a pedestrian and cycle ferry service across the River Thames in Surrey, South East England. The service has operated almost continuously for over 500 years.

== Description ==
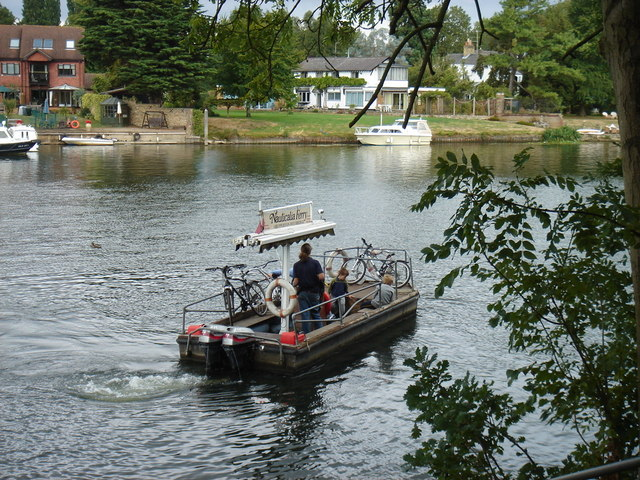
The ferry seen from the Weybridge bank

The ferry runs from Ferry Lane, Shepperton, on the north bank of the River Thames, to Weybridge on the south bank. It provides a crossing for the Thames Path, and is the only ferry on route of the path itself. The ferry, which is operated by Nauticalia, conveys both pedestrians and bicycles.

The ferry runs every 15 minutes from 0800 on weekdays, 0900 on Saturdays, and 1000 on Sundays. Service finishes at 1700 to 1730 in winter and 1800 in summer. Operation is on request and intending passengers should ring the bell provided on each side of the river. Tickets can be bought in the Ferry Coffee Shop or on the ferry itself. When the ferry is not in service, the nearest alternative is to cross the river downstream at Walton Bridge, a round-trip distance of some 3 miles (4.8 km) on foot, further by car.

== History ==
Map of Shepperton and Weybridge in 1920 showing the two ferries across the River Thames

A ferry at "Scheperton", owned by a John de Bello Camo, is mentioned in the Calendar of Inquisitions Post Mortem of 1317. It ran from Ferry Square, Shepperton, to the opposite bank of the River Thames, now part of Desborough Island. A second ferry, operating close to the site of the current lock, is thought to have begun operating in the 15th century and was primarily used to transport cattle and horses.

Shepperton Lock opened in 1813 and the first lock keeper, William Hatch, appears to have taken over the second ferry and to have allowed passengers to use it. William Downton, the owner of the first ferry, complained to the Corporation of London in 1815, stating that his income had declined as a result. The corporation ordered Hatch to desist, but he had started operating again by 1820. Another complaint was raised, but the influential Winch family of Shepperton backed Hatch, who was permitted to continue to transport animals across the Thames at the lock, but was forbidden from carrying passengers. The Winch family are thought to have paid for the construction of Ferry Lane, which leads from the old village centre of Shepperton to the lock, in around 1843.

Hatch retired in 1860 after serving as lock keeper for 48 years. The following year, the owner of the first ferry complained again that the ferry at the lock was carrying passengers once more. Nevertheless, the two ferries continued to operate until the mid-1950s when the first ferry closed. The ferry at the lock ceased operations in 1960.

After a hiatus of 26 years, the ferry at Shepperton Lock resumed operations in March 1986. Operated by Nauticalia, it initially ran every hour, increased to every half hour the following May.

== In film, fiction and the media ==
In the science fiction novel The War of the Worlds by H. G. Wells, the Shepperton to Weybridge Ferry is the scene of the first confrontation between the British military, six twelve-pound artillery pieces, and the Martians, five fighting-machines, that the protagonist witnesses. A Martian is destroyed by a direct hit from an artillery shell, and its comrades use their heat rays to wreak vengeance on the fleeing crowds waiting to cross the river.

== See also ==
- Hampton Ferry (River Thames)
- Crossings of the River Thames

Next crossing upstream	River Thames	Next crossing downstream
Chertsey Bridge (road)	Shepperton to Weybridge Ferry	Walton Bridge (road)
Next crossing upstream	Thames Path	Next crossing downstream
northern bank Staines Bridge	Shepperton to Weybridge Ferry (alternative Walton Bridge)	southern bank Hampton Court Bridge
