= Mathematical Bridge =

Wooden arch bridge in Cambridge, England

Mathematical bridge
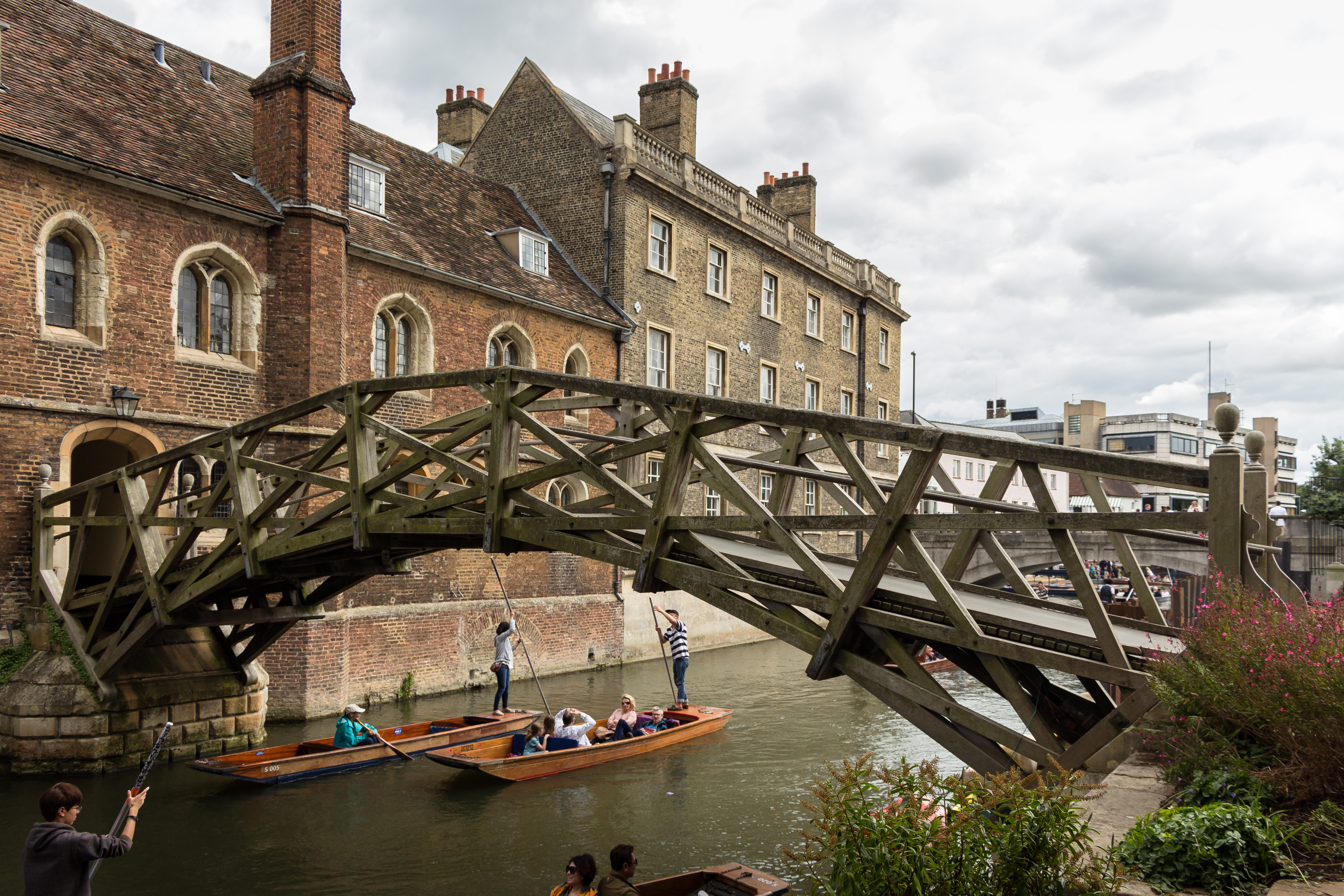
- Mathematical Bridge at the University of Cambridge in 2016
- Coordinates: 52°12′08.0″N 0°06′54.2″E
- Crosses: River Cam
- Locale: Queens' College, Cambridge
- Official name: Queens' Bridge, Wooden Bridge
- Preceded by: Silver Street Bridge
- Followed by: King's College Bridge

Characteristics
- Design: Truss bridge
- Material: Wood, on stone abutments.
- No. of spans: One

History
- Designer: William Etheridge
- Construction end: 1906 (Current bridge)

Location
- Location within Cambridge

The Mathematical Bridge is a wooden footbridge in the southwest of central Cambridge, England. It bridges the River Cam about one hundred feet northwest of Silver Street Bridge and connects two parts of Queens' College. Its official name is simply the Wooden Bridge or Queens' Bridge. It is a Grade II listed building.

The bridge was designed by William Etheridge, and built by James Essex in 1749. It has been rebuilt on two occasions, in 1866 and in 1905, but has kept the same overall design. Although it appears to be an arch, it is composed entirely of straight timbers built to an unusually sophisticated engineering design, hence the name.

A replica of the bridge was built in 1923 near the Iffley Lock in Oxford.

The original Mathematical Bridge was another bridge of the same design, also commissioned by James Essex, crossing the Cam between Trinity and Trinity Hall colleges, where Garret Hostel Bridge now stands.

== Mathematical explanation ==
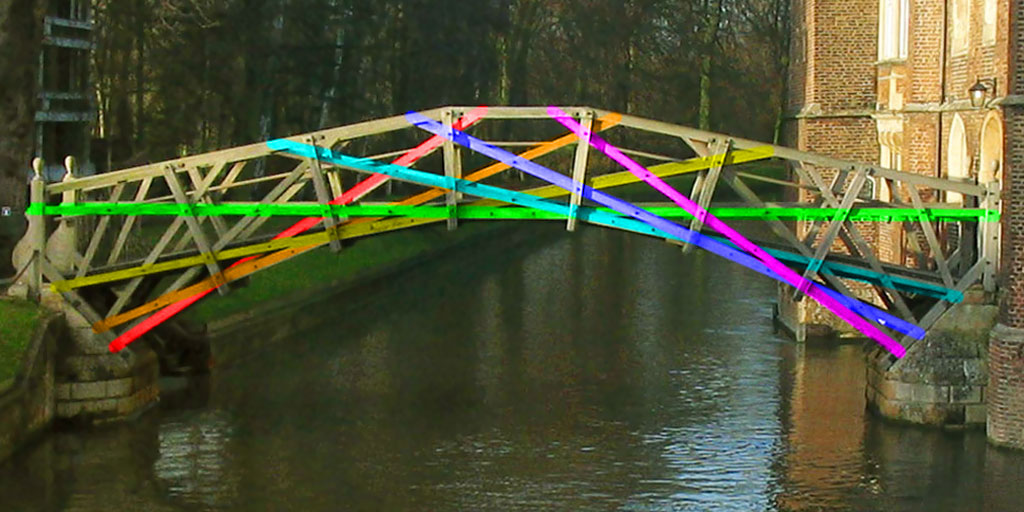
The tangential members of the tangent and radial trussing are highlighted

The arrangement of timbers is a series of tangents that describe the arc of the bridge, with radial members to tie the tangents together and triangulate the structure, making it rigid and self-supporting. This type of structure, technically tangent and radial trussing, is an efficient structural use of timber, and was also used for the timber supporting arches (centring) used for building stone bridges. Analysis of the design shows that the tangent members are almost entirely under compression, while the radial timbers are almost entirely subject to tension with very little bending stress, or to put it another way, the tangent and radial elements elegantly express the forces involved in arched construction.

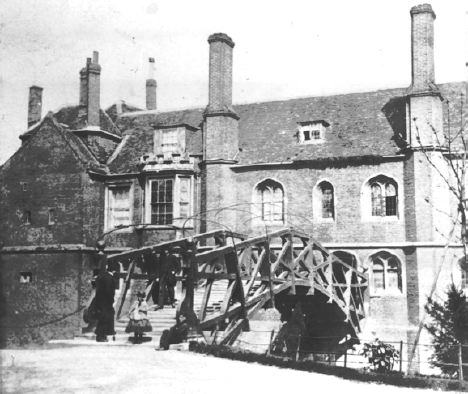
The Mathematical Bridge (approx. 1865) pictured shortly before it was partially rebuilt in 1866

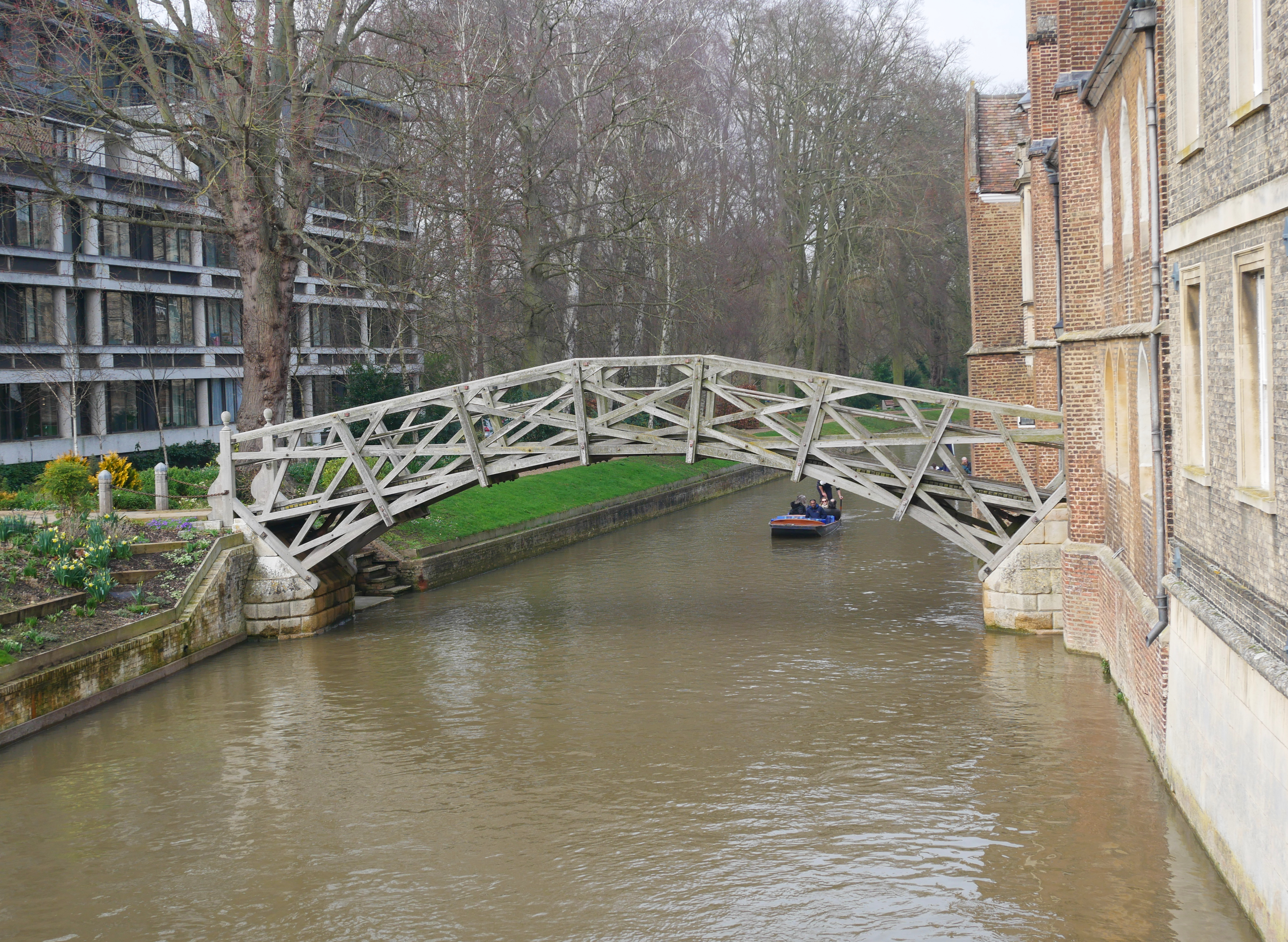
South face of the Mathematical Bridge

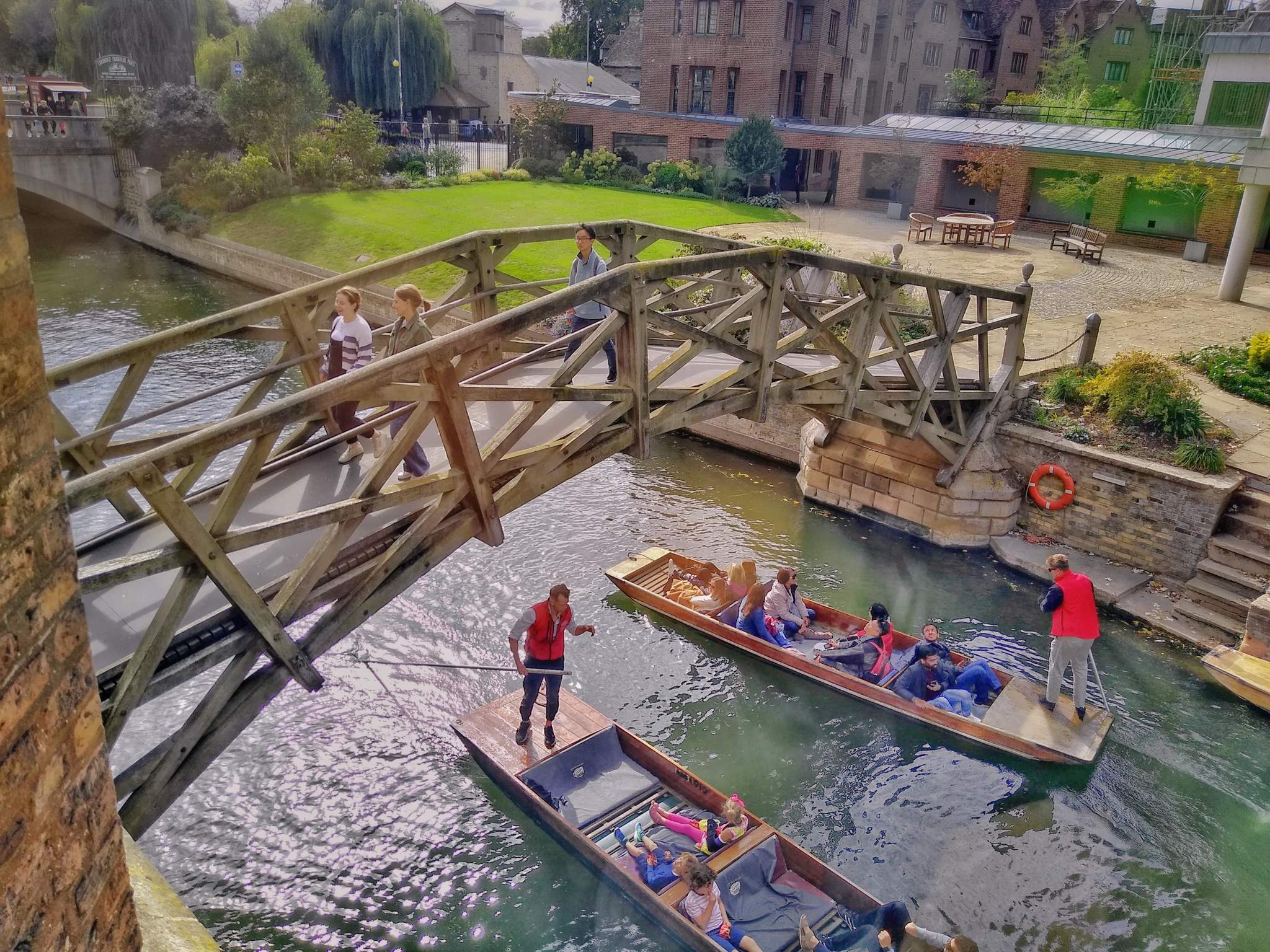
The bridge from Queens' College's Riverside Building

== Myths ==
A popular fable is that the bridge was designed and built by Sir Isaac Newton without the use of nuts or bolts. Various stories relate how at some point in the past either students or fellows of the university attempted to take the bridge apart and put it back together, but were unable to work out how to hold the structure together, and were obliged to resort to adding nuts and bolts. In reality, bolts or the equivalent are an inherent part of the design. When it was first built, iron spikes were driven into the joints from the outer side, where they could not be seen from the inside of the parapets, explaining why bolts were thought to be an addition to the original. Newton could not have been directly involved since he died in 1727, twenty-two years before the bridge was constructed.

== See also ==
- List of bridges in Cambridge
- Old Walton Bridge, a larger bridge on the same principle, also designed by William Etheridge.
