= Walton Bridges =

Painting by J. M. W. Turner

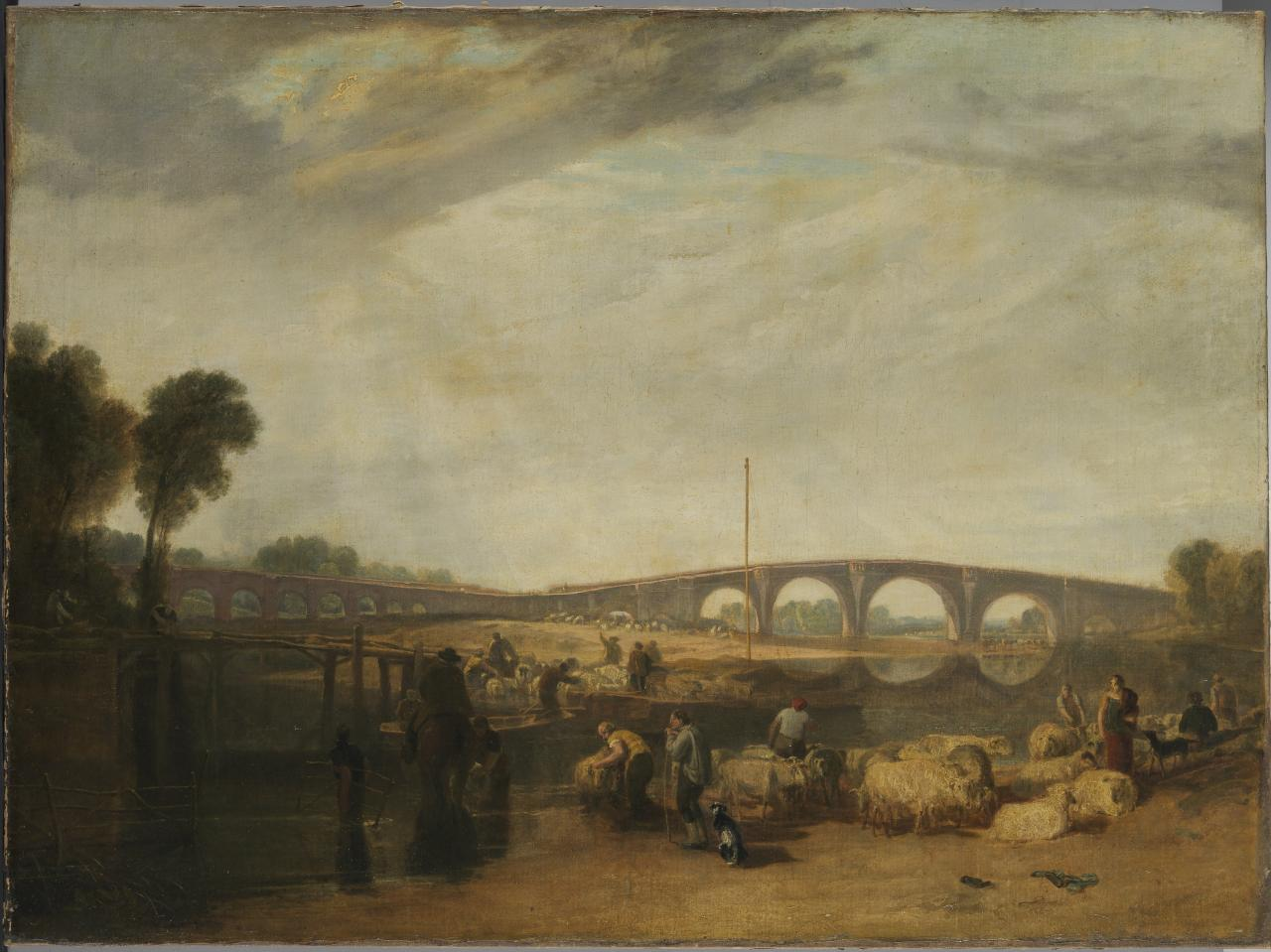
- Artist: J. M. W. Turner
- Year: c.1806
- Medium: Oil on canvas
- Dimensions: 91.2 cm × 122.5 cm (35.9 in × 48.2 in)
- Location: National Gallery of Victoria; Melbourne
- Accession: 981-3
- Website: ngv.vic.gov.au/explore/collection/work/4425/

Walton Bridges is a c.1806 landscape painting by the British artist J.M.W. Turner. It depicts a view on the River Thames at Walton. Two stone bridges existed at the time, creating twin parabolas. This had replaced the older mid-eighteenth century bridge once painted by Canaletto. Rather than displaying it at the Summer Exhibition of the Royal Academy, he possibly exhibited at his own studio in Queen Anne Street. 1807.

It was acquired by the Earl of Essex in 1807 and hung at his estate at Cassiobury House along with two other Turner paintings. Today it is in the collection of the National Gallery of Victoria in Melbourne, having been acquired in 1920.

== See also ==
- List of paintings by J. M. W. Turner
- A View of Walton Bridge, a 1754 painting by the Italian artist Canaletto

== Bibliography ==
- Bailey, Anthony. J.M.W. Turner: Standing in the Sun. Tate Enterprises Ltd, 2013.
- Hamilton, James. Turner – A Life. Sceptre, 1998.
- Moyle, Franny. Turner: The Extraordinary Life and Momentous Times of J. M. W. Turner. Penguin Books, 2016.
- Reynolds, Graham. Turner. Thames & Hudson, 2022.
