= Samuel Dicker =

British politician (died 1760)

Samuel Dicker (died 1760), was an English politician who represented Plymouth in the British House of Commons in the eighteenth century, and was also responsible for the building of the first Walton Bridge in Surrey.

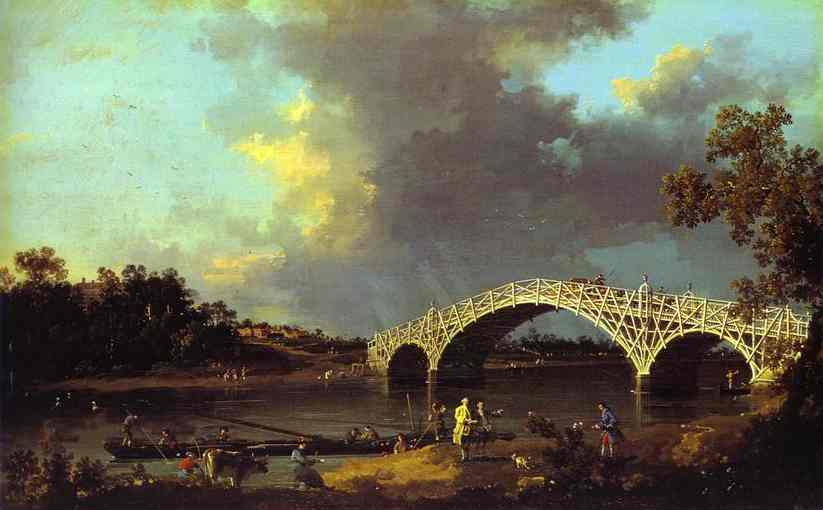
Old Walton Bridge by Canaletto,1754

Dicker owned plantations in Jamaica and 1738 was appointed a Councilor of Jamaica. He was also a landowner of Walton on the Thames and created an estate at Mount Felix. In 1750 he built the first bridge across the River Thames at Walton at his own expense, obtaining an act of Parliament to enable him to do so and levy tolls. The bridge was painted in 1755 by Canaletto who referred to Il Signiore Cavaliere Dicker.

In 1754, Dicker was elected Member of Parliament for Plymouth, the port and major Royal Navy base in Devon. He held the seat until he died in 1760. He was unmarried and Mount Felix was sold, falling into the possession of the Earls of Tankerville.

Parliament of Great Britain
Preceded by Captain Charles Saunders	Member of Parliament for Plymouth; 1754–1760	Succeeded by The Viscount Barrington
