= Hampton Ferry (River Thames) =

Ferry between London and Surrey

Coordinates: 51.4120°N 0.3625°W

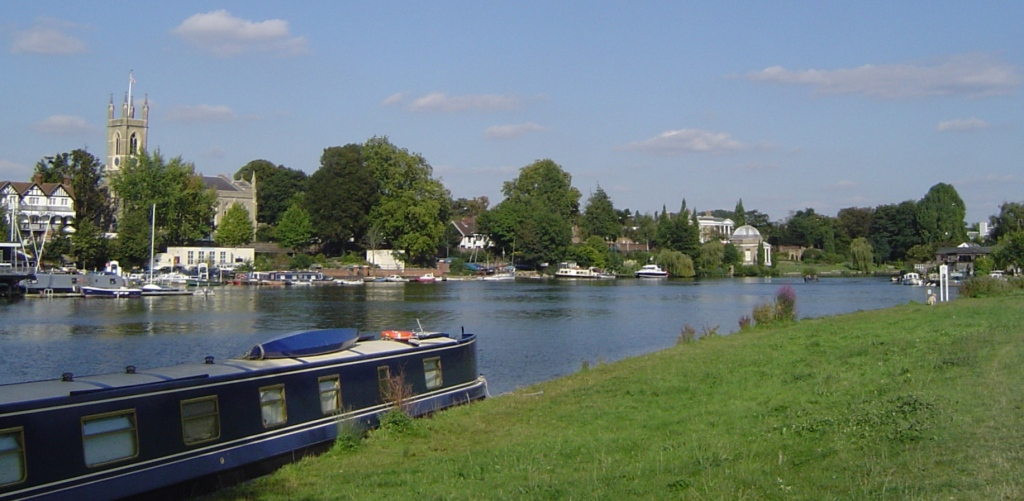
Hurst Park, the ferry's terminus on the south side of the Thames

Hampton Ferry is a seasonal foot (and cycle) ferry across the Thames in England. It is about 1 mile (1.6 km) upstream, west, of Hampton Court Bridge. The bridge links a busy zone of activity on both banks including Hampton Court Palace. The ferry links a large riverside park to the oldest parts of the town of Hampton, London, including its church, inn and various listed buildings such as Garrick House which is private apartments and Garrick's Temple to Shakespeare beside a narrow strip of sloped bank. This is known as Saint Albans Riverside, as it was owned by one of the Dukes of Saint Albans, seated at Hanworth House and Park, about two miles away. On the north side, this part of former Middlesex became outer-most London in 1965 by an Act of 1963. The towpath on the south side is for about 400 metres each way in public grassland with picnic places and beyond, for about 1 mile (1.6 km) shaded by trees, east and west.

== Details ==
The ferry links Hampton, on the north bank and in the London Borough of Richmond, with Moulsey or Molesey Hurst, the largest park of Molesey on the south bank and in Surrey.

The ferry is in the Molesey, Hampton and Sunbury reach (between Molesey and Sunbury Locks). It is one of two of this reach's Thames crossings – both are ferries. These are the only crossings between Hampton Court and Walton Bridges.

The ferry operates between March and October inclusive; every day on demand. It can be boarded opposite Hampton's oldest church which is on the north bank, and by the Molesey Heritage Marker on the south bank.

The ferry has been operating since 1514, with the first crossings made from Hampton primarily for fishermen to fish in the then seasonally marshy and reed-laden Moulsey Hurst, which ate much further into the east/west parishes (and manors) of Molesey, but also for the hire of agricultural workers and presumably for walks and for bargemens' work/relief to the nearby inn as the grounds were public, as a common. The towpath is on the south bank. Its incorporation by statute makes it one of the 10 oldest British companies and among the 150 oldest companies in Europe.

== See also ==
- Crossings of the River Thames
- List of oldest companies
- London River Services

Next crossing upstream	River Thames	Next crossing downstream
Walton Bridge (road)	Hampton Ferry	Hampton Court Bridge (road)
