= Hampton Court Bridge =

Bridge over the Thames linking London with Surrey, England

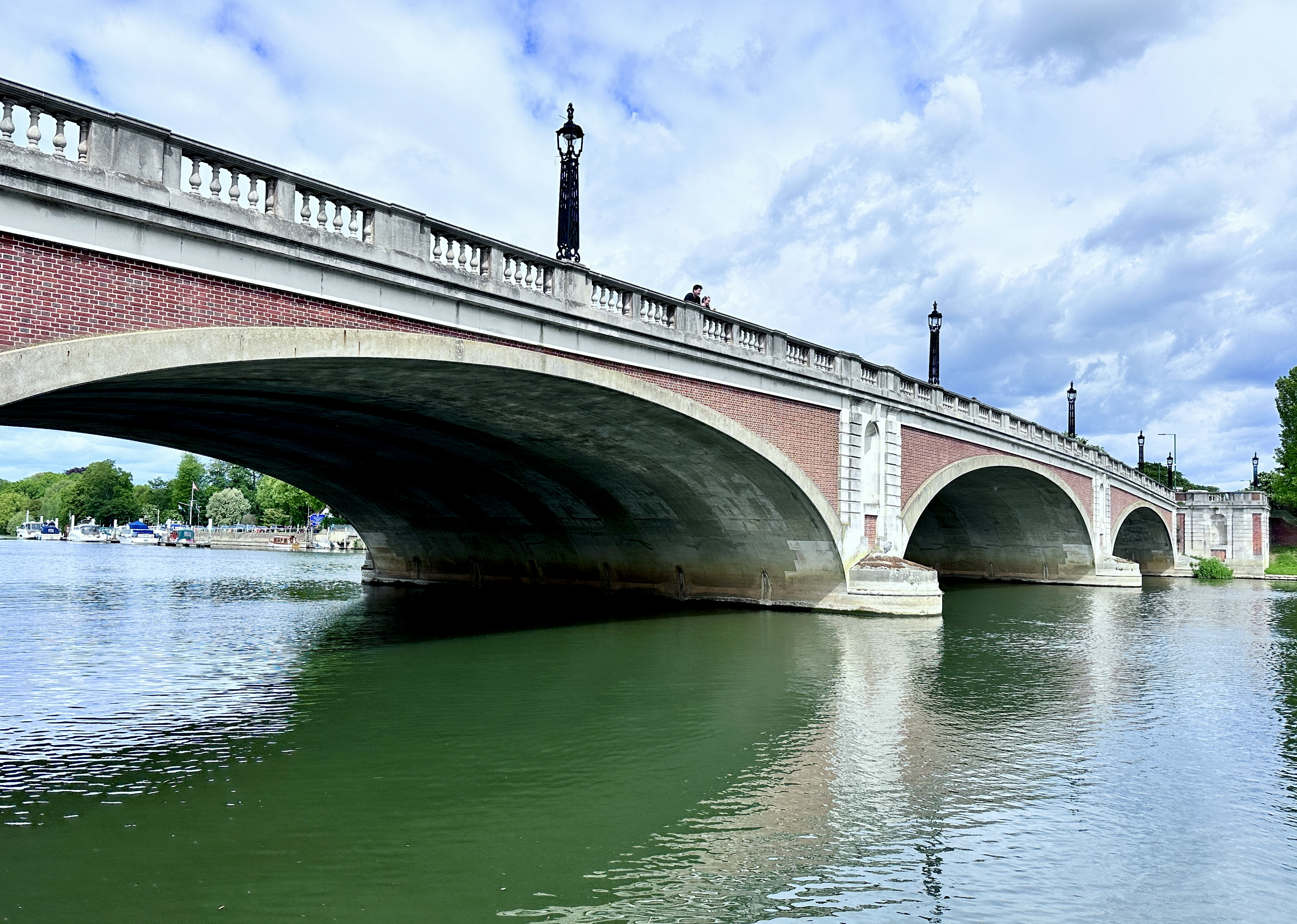
- Hampton Court bridge in 2026
- Coordinates: 51°24′14″N 0°20′33″W
- Carries: Thames Path
- Crosses: River Thames
- Locale: East Molesey; Hampton
- Maintained by: Surrey County Council
- Heritage status: Grade II listed structure

Characteristics
- Design: Arch
- Material: Concrete with a brick finish
- Total length: 320 feet 0 inches (97.54 m)
- Width: 70 feet 0 inches (21.34 m)
- Height: 19 ft 5 in (5.9 m)
- No. of spans: 3
- Piers in water: 2

History
- Designer: W. P. Robinson; Sir Edward Lutyens
- Opened: 3 July 1933

Statistics
- Toll: Abolished 1876

Location
- Interactive map of Hampton Court Bridge

Designations

Listed Building – Grade II
- Official name: Hampton Court Bridge
- Designated: 2 September 1952
- Reference no.: 1358100

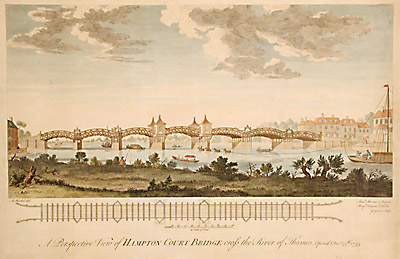
Engraving by Charles Grignion the Elder (after A. Heckel) of the 1753 bridge

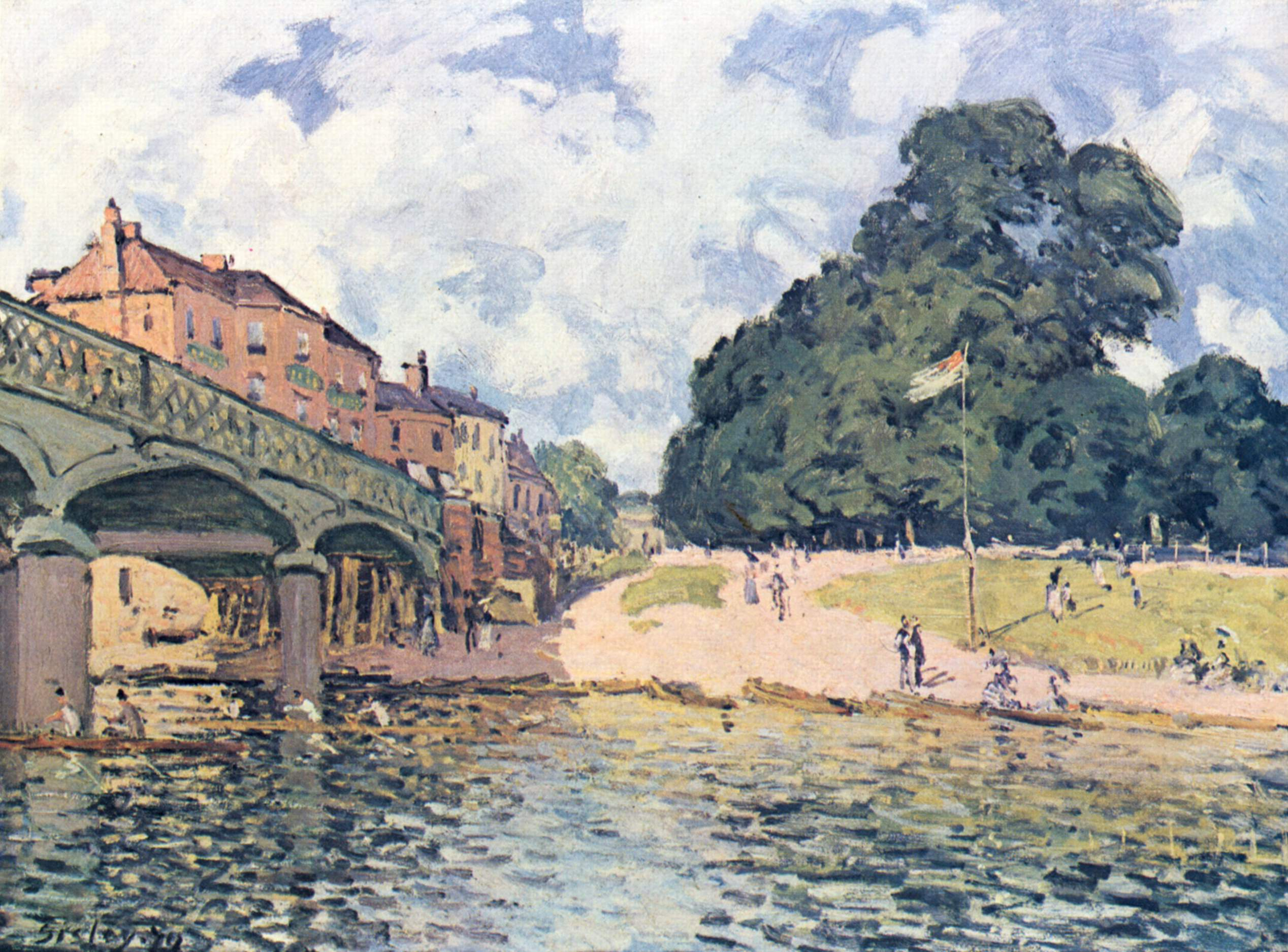
Alfred Sisley's painting of the third iron bridge

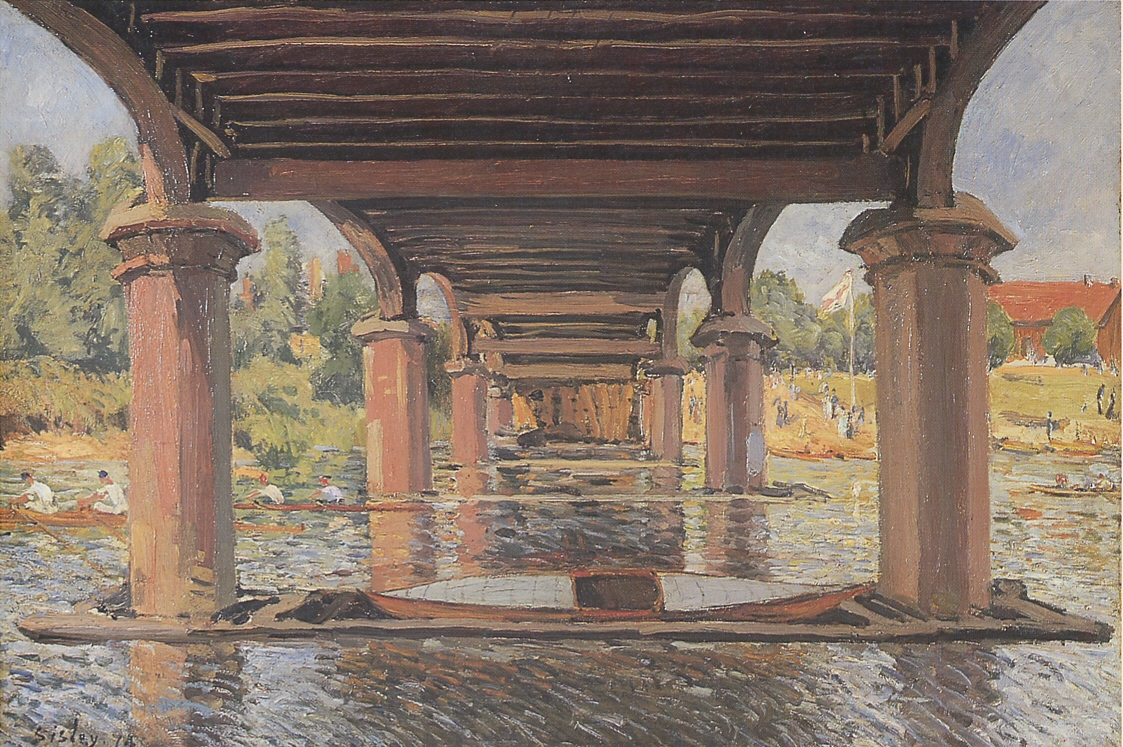
Alfred Sisley's painting under the third bridge

Hampton Court Bridge is a Grade II listed bridge that crosses the River Thames in England approximately north–south between Hampton, London and East Molesey, Surrey, carrying the A309. It is the upper of two road bridges on the reach above Teddington Lock and downstream of Molesey Lock.

The bridge is the most upstream crossing of all of the Thames bridges of Greater London; uniquely one bank is within the county. The Thames Path crosses the river here.

== Historic crossings ==
=== Ferry ===
The location of the bridge had been a ferry crossing point since at least the Tudor period.

=== First bridge ===
Hampton Court Bridge Act 1749
- Act of Parliament
- Parliament of Great Britain
- Long title: An Act for building a Bridge cross the River of Thames, from Hampton Court, in the County of Middlesex, to East Moulsey, in the County of Surry.
- Citation: 23 Geo. 2. c. 37
- Territorial extent: Great Britain

Dates
- Royal assent: 12 April 1750
- Commencement: 16 November 1749 (Note: Start of session.)
- Repealed: 30 July 1948
Other legislation
Repealed by	Statute Law Revision Act 1948

Status: Repealed

Text of statute as originally enacted

In 1750, James Clarke obtained an act of Parliament, the Hampton Court Bridge Act 1749 (23 Geo. 2. c. 37), to construct a privately owned bridge at Hampton Court. The first bridge was constructed by Samuel Stevens and Benjamin Ludgator from 1752 until 1753 and opened on 13 December that year. It had seven wooden arches and was built in the Chinoiserie design of the Willow pattern that was popular at the time, attested by two prints made in the year of its opening and the year after.

=== Second bridge ===
This bridge was replaced by a more sturdy eleven-arch wooden bridge in 1778. By 1840 this bridge had become dilapidated and the owner appealed to the Corporation of London to support reconstruction. Among their arguments were that since the bridge was built, the city had created Molesey Lock and Weir and as a consequence navigation through the bridge was dangerous. The bridge was described at about this time as "crazy, hog-backed, inconvenient and obstructive of the navigation".

=== Third bridge ===
From 1864 to 1865 construction took place on the third bridge on the site. It opened on 10 April 1865. It was built to a design by E. T. Murray and commissioned by the bridge's owner Thomas Allan. The new bridge consisted of wrought iron lattice girders resting on four cast iron columns. The road approach was between battlemented brick walls. An illustrative fragment of these approach walls remains on the south bank immediately west of the bridge. The design was heavily criticised; it was described simply in 1911 by one historic gazetteer, the Victoria County History as "inartistic". A less diplomatic contemporary commentator called it "one of the ugliest bridges in England, and a flagrant eyesore and disfigurement both to the river and to Hampton Court." Despite the criticism, it proved extremely lucrative for Allen, earning him over £3,000 annually in tolls until he was bought out in 1876 for £48,048 by a joint committee of the Hampton and Molesey local boards and the Corporation of London, using powers granted by the Kew and Other Bridges Act 1869 (32 & 33 Vict. c. xix).

== The modern bridge ==
The modern bridge is the fourth on the site. The bridge has three wide arches, is designed to be able to carry quite heavy motorised road traffic and is constructed of reinforced concrete, faced with red bricks and white Portland stone on its pontoons, dressings, and balustrades.

The bridge was one of three authorised by Parliament in 1928 (the others being Twickenham Bridge and Chiswick Bridge). It was designed by the Surrey county engineer W. P. Robinson and the architect Sir Edwin Lutyens to reflect the style of the portions of Hampton Court Palace designed by Sir Christopher Wren – whose architectural style has another legacy by the bridge, as his well-conserved blue-plaqued house in which he lived his final years faces the roundabout by the two north bank roads which meet just north of the bridge and palace front gate. To ensure that traffic could still cross, the new bridge was built a short distance downstream from the old, which was subsequently demolished.

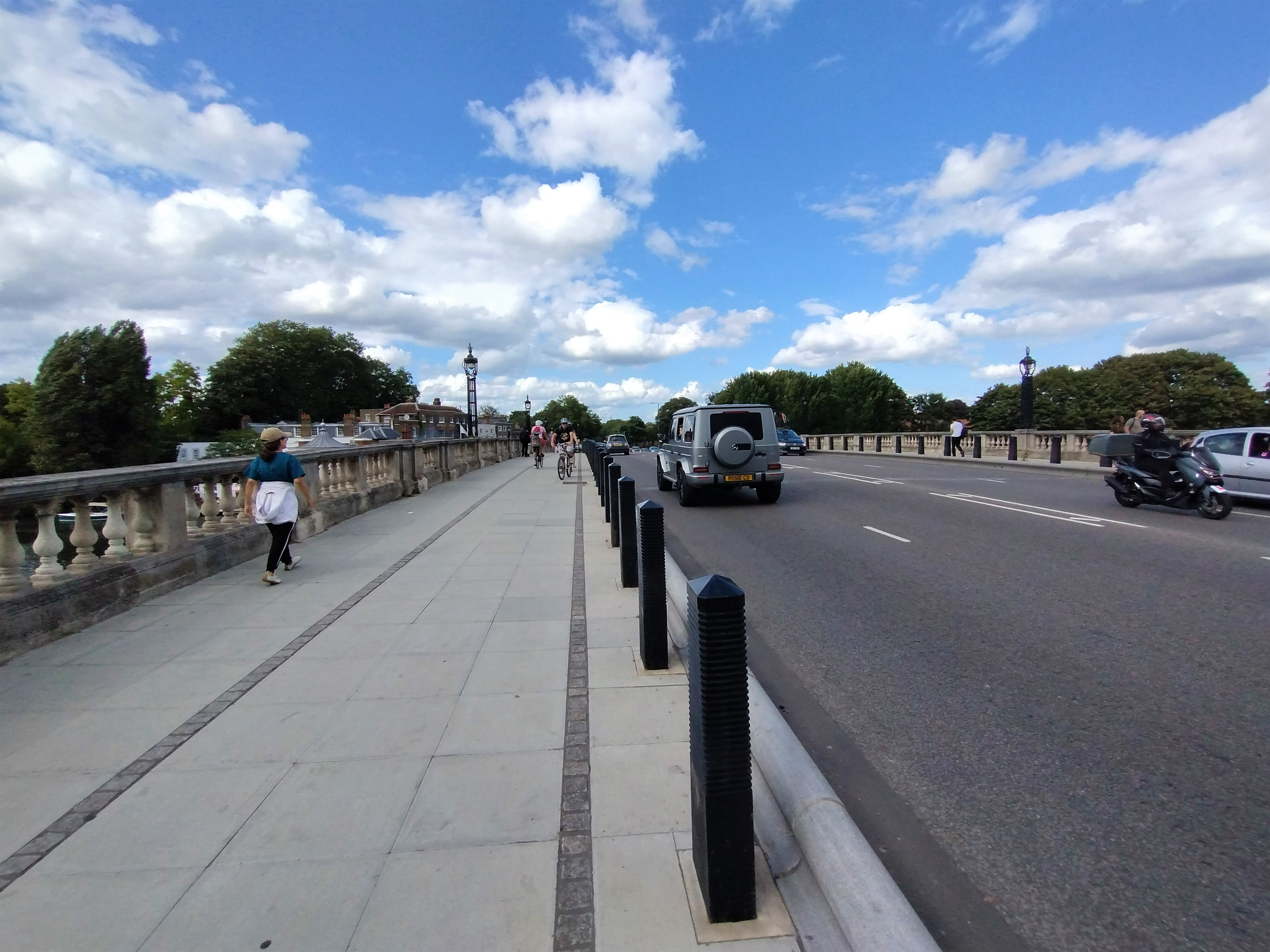
Hampton Bridge Road view 2023

Construction began in September 1930. The work required the demolition of a small hotel (The Old Castle) and, to the south, diversion of the flow of the River Mole into the River Ember, formerly the secondary distributary of the Mole. The bridge was opened by the Prince of Wales (who became King Edward VIII) on 3 July 1933, on the same day as the opening of Chiswick and Twickenham bridges, which carry the A316 (and between those sections is still occasionally nicknamed the 'Richmond bypass'). The bridge was Grade II listed in 1952 for its architecture.

=== Surroundings ===
Immediate environs

Aside from two parallel lines of architecturally rich buildings and riverside homes – approximately half of which are listed on the north bank are Hampton Court Palace and Gardens, Hampton Court Park and Bushy Park, Royal Parks.

On the south bank is a one-way street of restaurants, boutiques, and bars surrounded by apartments immediately then homes with gardens west of Hampton Court railway station. On the Thames itself, a few hundred metres to either side are Molesey Lock on the Thames and the mouth of the River Mole, on the south side.

=== Roads ===
Hampton Court Way (A309)

The bridge construction was taken as the opportunity for Surrey County Council to construct a new road, which starts at the same road as before with its roundabout with the A308 (Staines–Kingston road) (then running south between the palace's entrance driveway and a short row of a hotel/restaurant, a restaurant and shop), before becoming being considerably straighter than the existing old roads as a route south. Numbered A309, this connects directly with the A307 (Old London–Portsmouth road) and more recently with the A3(M) motorway deeper into Surrey than the old route.

A3050

The A3050 commences immediately southwest of the bridge and passes through three riverside settlements: the rest of Molesey and the towns of Walton-on-Thames and Weybridge also in Elmbridge, Surrey.

Neighbouring bridges

The next bridge downstream is 1.5 miles (2.4 km) and upstream is exactly 4 miles (6.4 km).

The next downstream bridge has considerably older predecessors going back to the early medieval period and is the only other of the reach, Kingston Bridge, London – it is pale brick and stone only and of taller design with two extra arches.

The next bridge upstream was replaced in 2013 with a single-span bridge heading up the Thames, a tied arch bridge, Walton Bridge.

== See also ==
- List of crossings of the River Thames
- List of bridges in London

== Bibliography ==
- Weinreb, Ben; Hibbert, Christopher; Keay, Julia; Keay, John (2008). The London Encyclopedia. Macmillan. ISBN 978-1-4050-4924-5.
- Elmbridge Borough Council – Information plaque at the Bridge

Next crossing upstream	River Thames	Next crossing downstream
Hampton Ferry (pedestrian)	Hampton Court Bridge; Grid reference TQ1538868481	Kingston Bridge (road)
Next crossing upstream	Thames Path	Next crossing downstream
southern bank Shepperton to Weybridge Ferry	Hampton Court Bridge; Grid reference TQ1538868481	northern bank Kingston Bridge
