= William Etheridge =

William Etheridge (baptised 3 January 1708 – 3 October 1776) was an English civil engineer and architect, best known for his work on several wooden bridges of mathematical design.

== Biography ==
William Etheridge was born around 1708 in a small village of Fressingfield, Suffolk, England. His parents were Charles Etheridge and Elizabeth Brett. He came from a long line of carpenters from Fressingfield and Stradbroke.

From 1744–1749, he worked on the supporting wooden structures during the construction of the Westminster Bridge, first as a foreman and then as the master carpenter.

Around 1748, he designed Old Walton Bridge.

Sometime before 1750, he designed the Old Bridge at Coleraine, Northern Ireland.

In 1752, George Semple consulted Etheridge on the rebuilding of Essex Bridge in Dublin.

Etheridge died on the 3 October 1776 in Westminster.

== Old Walton Bridge ==
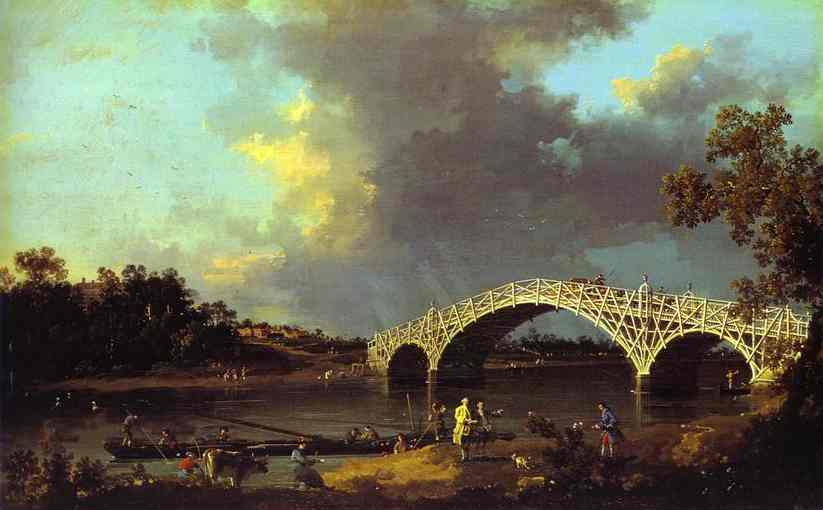
Old Walton Bridge (1754) by Canaletto

In 1747, businessman and plantation owner Samuel Dicker moved from Jamaica to a newly acquired estate in Mount Felix near Walton-on-Thames, Surrey, England. In order to facilitate easier access to his new home, he lobbied for an Act of Parliament, the Walton-Shepperton Bridge (Building and Tolls) Act 1746 (20 Geo. 2. c. 22) granting him rights to build a bridge and collect tolls on the spot.

The resulting latticework wooden bridge, known as Old Walton Bridge was designed by William Etheridge and built by Mr White of Weybridge between 1748 and 1750. When it opened, its central span of 130 feet was the longest in Britain (succeeded in 1756 by William Edwards's 140 feet long single-arch Pontypridd Bridge). At the time, it was widely admired for its "strength, contrivance and remarkable great arch" and was even dubbed "the most beautiful wooden arch in the world" by one observer.

The bridge was depicted by contemporary painters, most famously in two pictures by Canaletto.

Despite Dicker's initial projections of 200 years lifetime, a 1778 survey found the bridge to be severely decayed. It was soon demolished and replaced by a brick-and-stone version built in 1783–1786.

== Mathematical Bridge ==
The Mathematical Bridge is the popular name of a wooden footbridge in central Cambridge. It bridges the River Cam, connecting two parts of Queens' College, Cambridge. The bridge was designed by Etheridge and built by James Essex in 1749.

== Old Coleraine Bridge ==
Sometime before 1750, Etheridge designed the Old Bridge over River Bann at Coleraine, Northern Ireland. It was a timber construction on masonry piers, replacing an earlier bridge damaged in 1732. It was replaced by the current Coleraine Bridge in 1844.
