= Museumslandschaft Hessen Kassel =

Museum, library, and heritage site in Germany

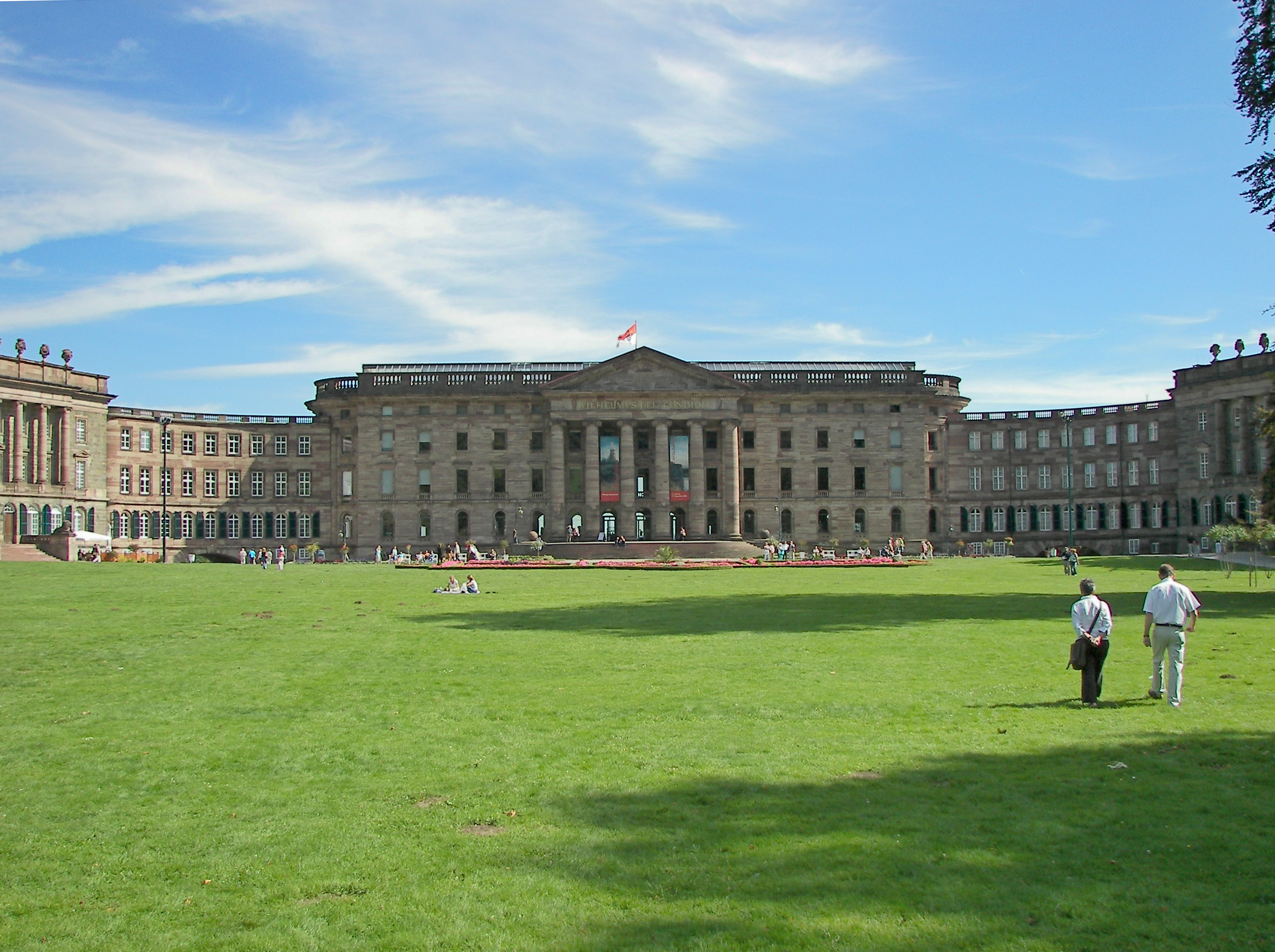
Schloss Wilhelmshöhe

The Hessen Kassel Heritage, formerly Museumslandschaft Hessen Kassel, represents a group of institutions in Kassel, Germany, comprising museums, associated research libraries, and supporting facilities. They are overseen by the German federal government in collaboration with Germany's federal state of Hesse. The central complex of Schloss Wilhelmshöhe with installed art in the park and grounds was added to the UNESCO list of World Heritage Sites in 2013.

The museum locations are:

== Bergpark Wilhelmshöhe ==
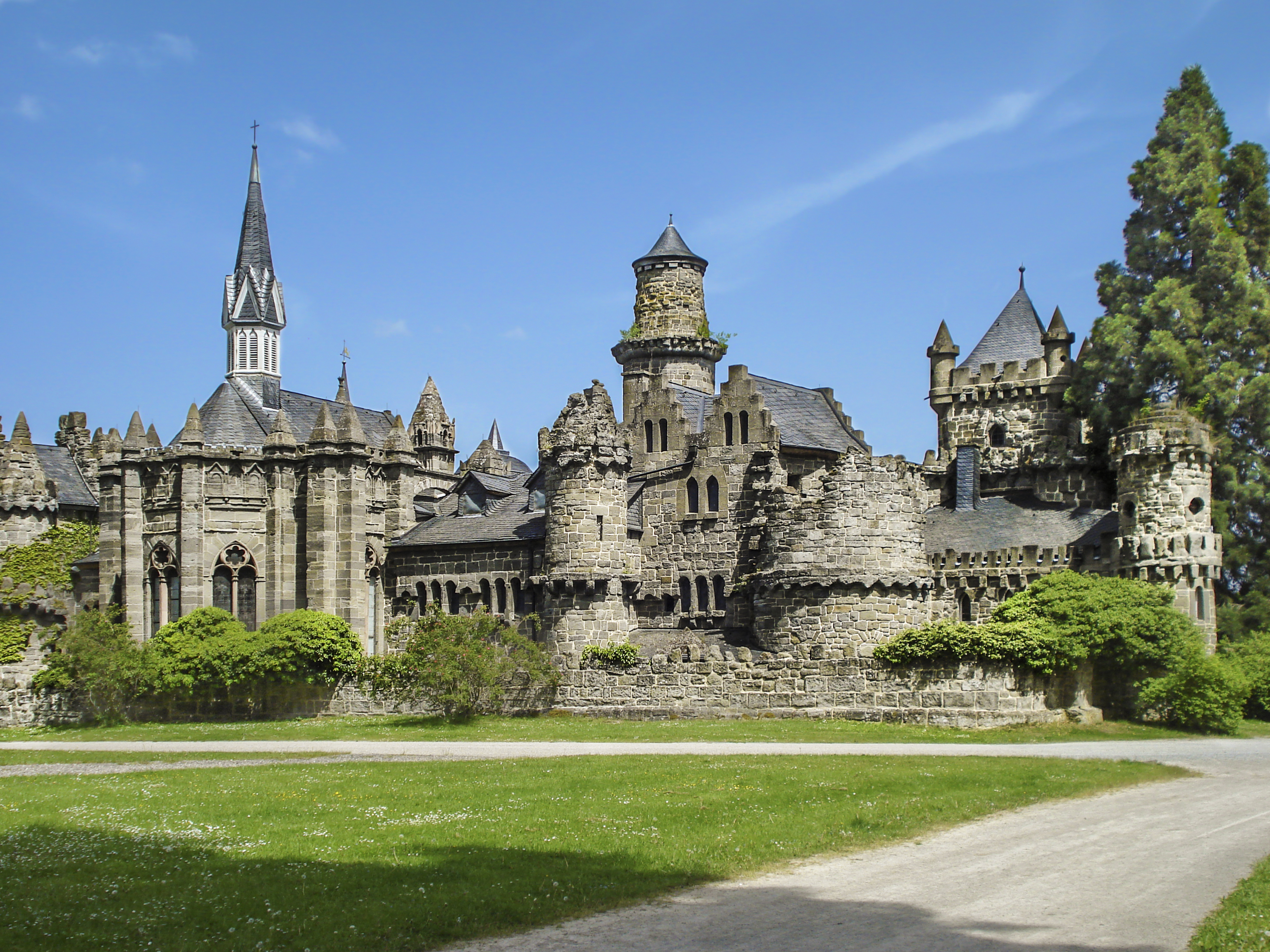
Löwenburg

- Herkules
- Wasserspiele
- Schloss Wilhelmshöhe
- Löwenburg
- Gewächshaus
- Ballhaus
- Kleinarchitekturen

== Staatspark Karlsaue ==
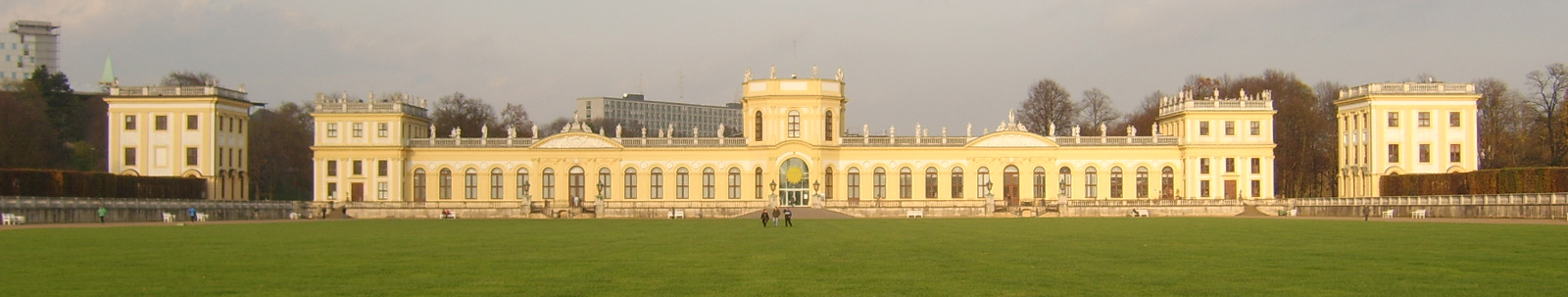
Orangerie

- Karlsaue
- Insel Siebenbergen
- Orangerie
- Astronomisch-Physikalisches Kabinett
- Planetarium
- Westpavillon
- Marmorbad

== Outside Kassel ==
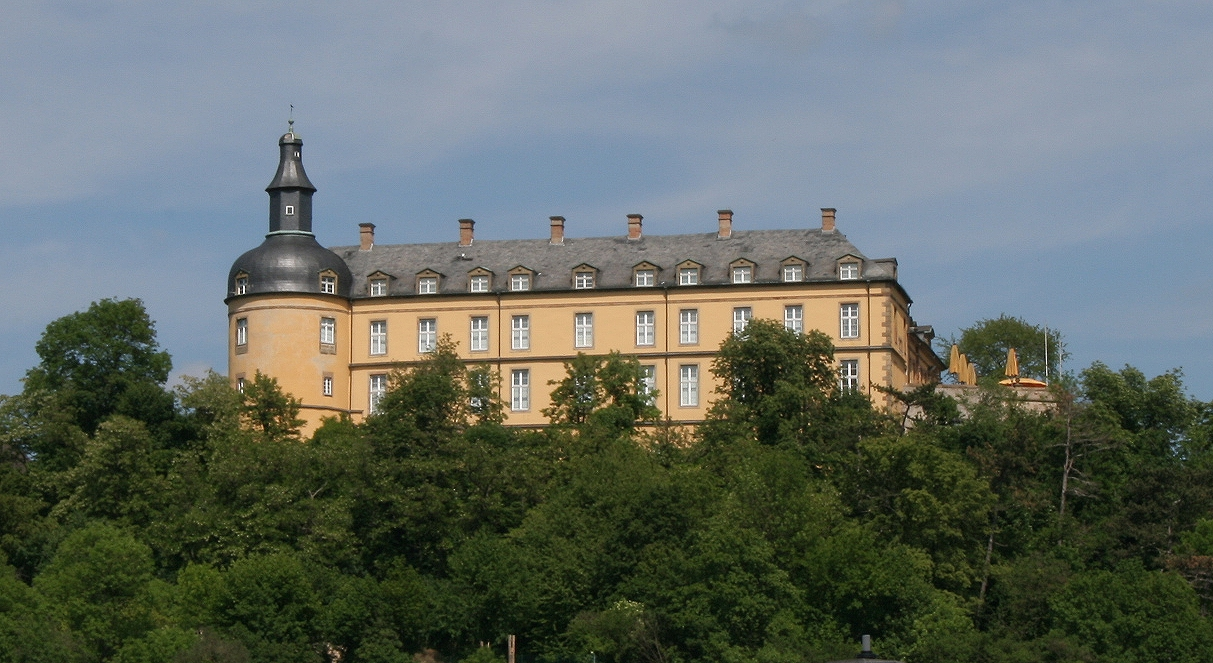
Schloss Friedrichstein

- Schloss Wilhelmsthal, Calden
- Schloss Friedrichstein, Bad Wildungen

== Other art museums ==
- Neue Galerie
- Hessisches Landesmuseum
- Deutsches Tapetenmuseum
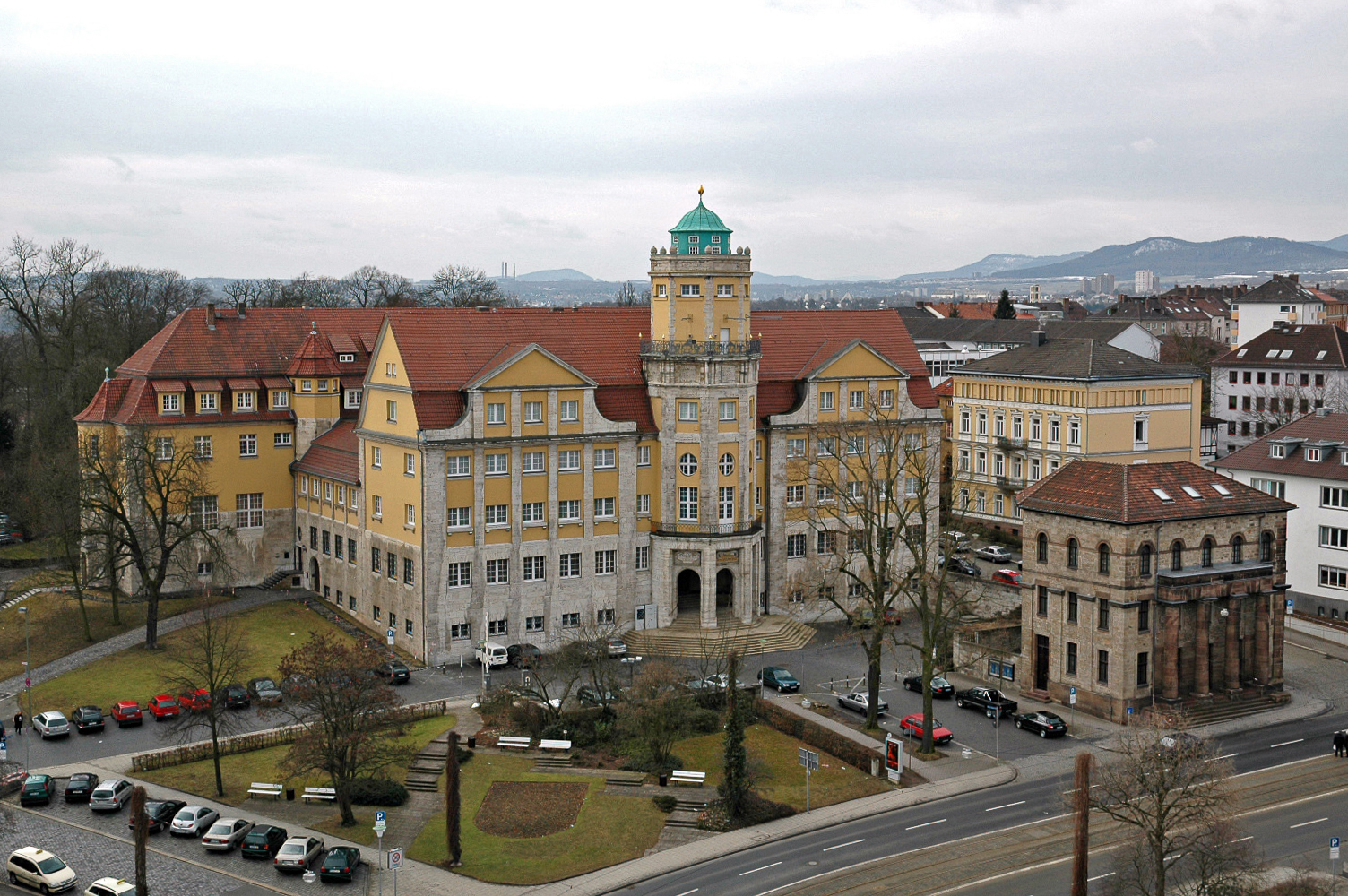
Hessisches Landesmuseum
