= Hessian State Museum =

Hessian State Museum may refer to:

- Hessian State Museum, Darmstadt
- Hessian State Museum, Kassel
- Museum Wiesbaden
