= Carl Kaiserling =

German pathologist

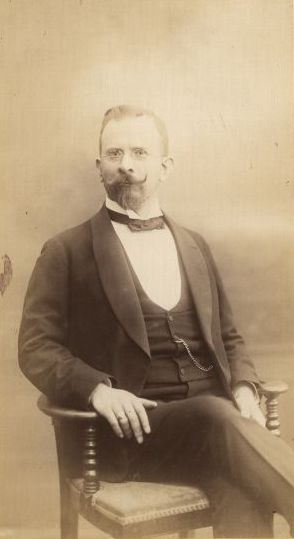
Carl Kaiserling (1869-1942)

Johann Carl Kaiserling (3 February 1869 – 20 August 1942) was a German pathologist who was a native of Kassel-Wehlheiden.

He studied medicine at the Ludwig-Maximilians-Universität München, Kiel University, and the Ludwig-Maximilians-Universität München, obtaining his medical doctorate in 1893. In 1902, he became privatdozent at the Friedrich Wilhelm University of Berlin, and from 1912 was a professor of general pathology and pathological anatomy at the University of Königsberg.

His name is associated with "Kaiserling's fixative", a means of preserving histologic and pathologic specimens without changing the natural color. This fixative is an aqueous solution of formalin, potassium nitrate and potassium acetate. Kaiserling is also known for his pioneer work in the field of photomicrography.

== Selected publications ==
- Praktikum der wissenschaftlichen Photographie, 1898.
- Lehrbuch der Mikrophotographie nebst Bemerkungen über Vergrösserung und Projektion, 1903.
- Die mikrophotographischen Apparate und ihre Handhabung, 1918.
