= Air-raid shelter am Weinberg =

Air-raid shelter in Kassel, Germany

Coordinates: 51°18′31″N 9°29′21″E

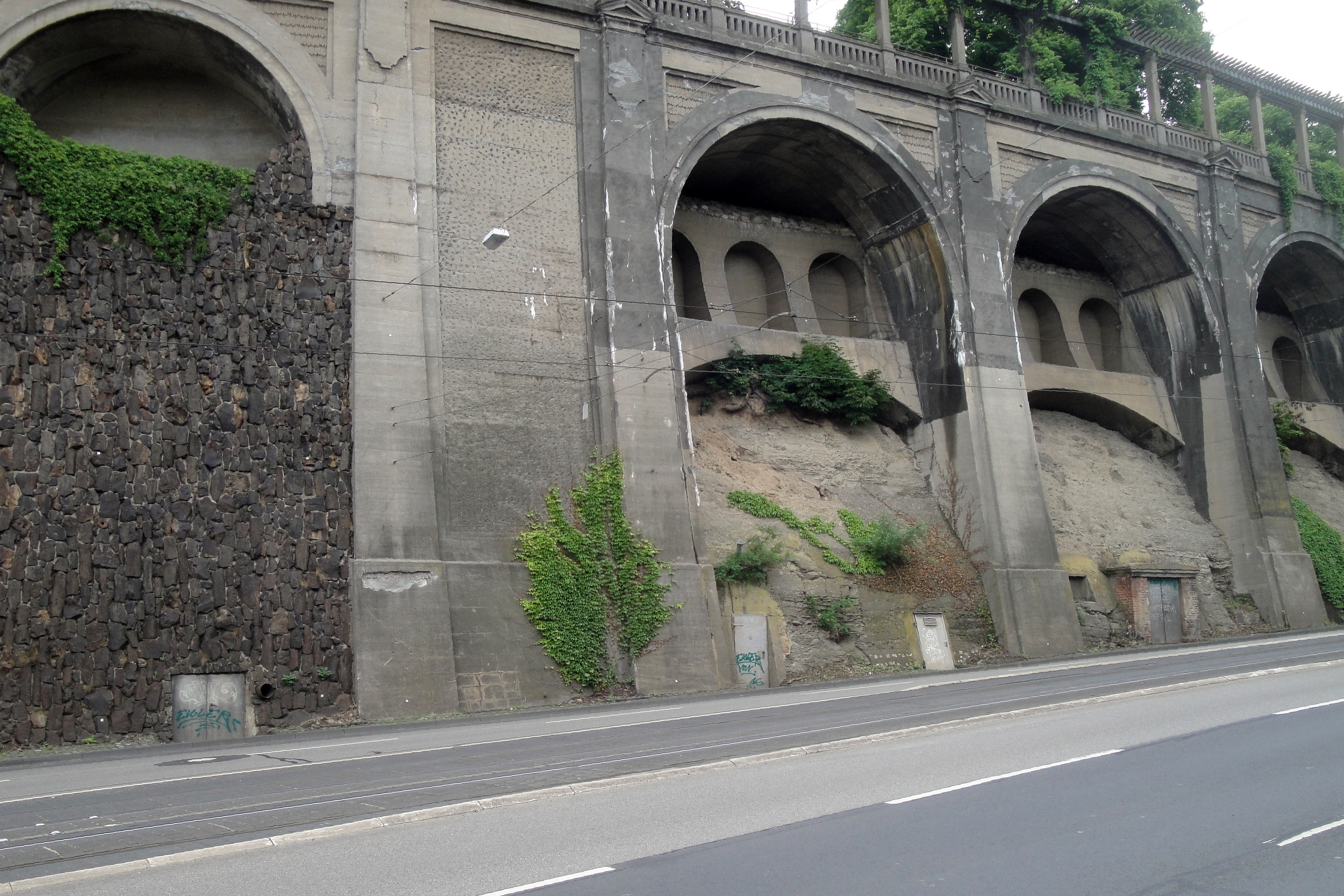
Exterior

Air-raid shelter am Weinberg (Bunker am Weinberg) in Kassel is a World War II air raid shelter built end of the 1930s.

== History ==
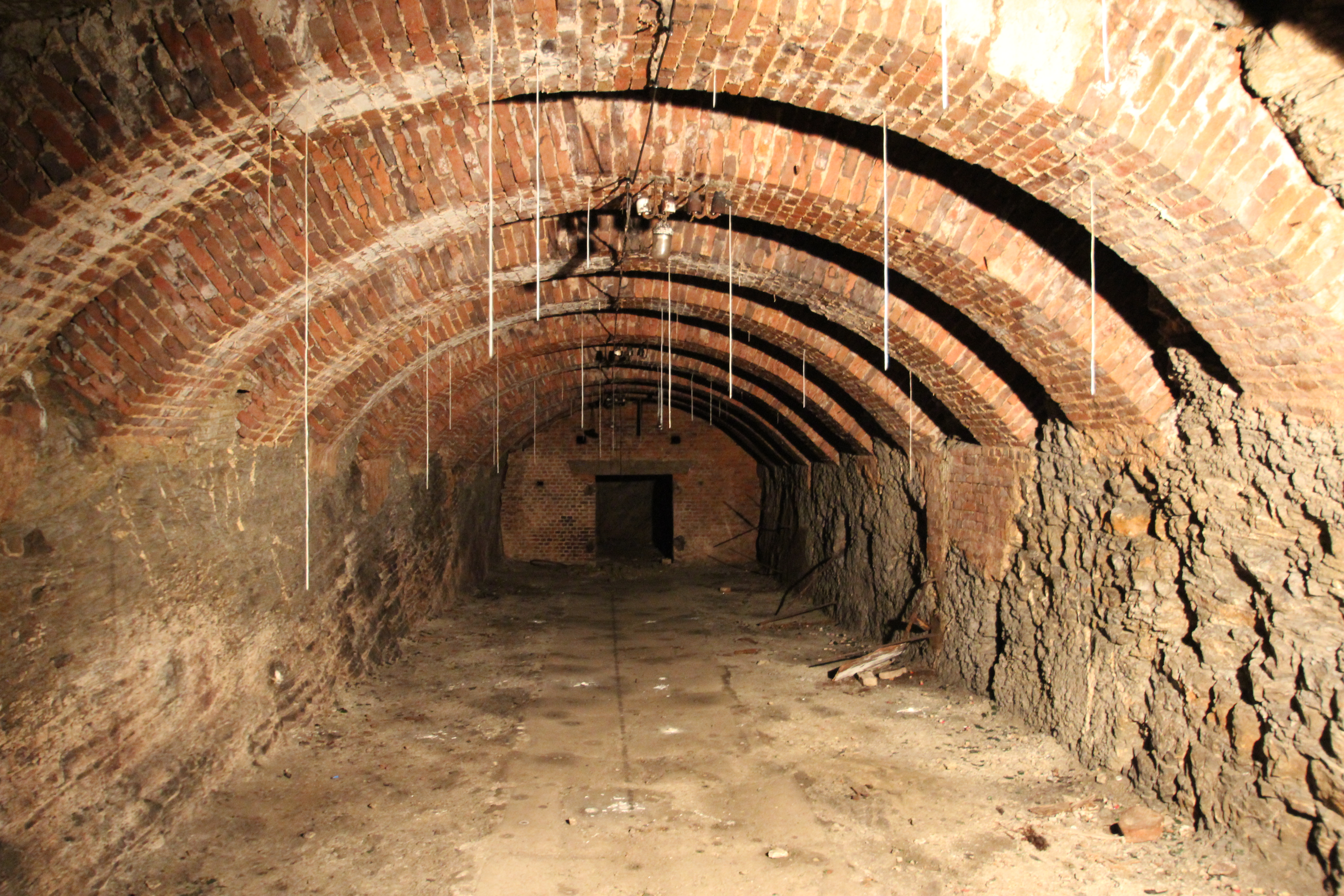
Interior

Tunnels in the soft limestone of the Weinberg, German for vineyard, were used for storage of ice and beer in the early 19th century. In the late 1930s the German government built air raid shelters in all major cities, and one of them was the Air-raid shelter am Weinberg in Kassel. The shelter was designed for 7500 people. During the war Kassel was targeted several times by large air raids, destroying most of the city. The most severe bombing took place 22/23 October 1943, at that point the bunker was filled with over 10 thousand people. The bunker had a medical section with an emergency room, as well as a military command section with a telecommunications centre.

== Today ==
The bunker was left unchanged, except that most of the equipment was reused shortly after the war. The most severe damage to the bunker was done by an illegal techno party in October 1992. The bunker can be visited by guided tours.
