= Johanna Vogt =

German activist, politician (1862–1944)

Johanna Sophia Wilhelmine Caroline Vogt (16 June 1862 – 12 March 1944) was a German suffragette and the first woman on the city council of Kassel starting in 1919.

From 1922 until 1923, Vogt was one of the six Lutheran members (and among them, the only woman) of the constitutional committee of the constituent church assembly, who worked out the joint constitution of the now Evangelical regional church in Hessen-Cassel, in which the Lutheran, the reformed, and Uniate churches were united.

Johanna Vogt was killed in a bomb attack in Berlin on the night of 11-12 March 1944. On the Marbachshöhe residential area in Kassel-Wilhelmshöhe, a street is named after her.
