= Dieter Koch-Weser =

German-American physician and medical researcher (1916–2015)

Dieter A. Koch-Weser
- Born: July 13, 1916; Kassel, Germany
- Died: July 19, 2015 (aged 99); North Andover, Massachusetts, U.S.
- Education: University of Chicago; Northwestern University, MSc, MD
- Occupations: Advocate of prevention, social medicine researcher, medical educator, AIDS researcher
- Spouse: Sophie C. Schwender Koch-Weser
- Children: 2
- Scientific career
- Workplaces: National Institutes of Health World Health Organization Harvard Harvard T.H. Chan School of Public Health Harvard Medical School

Dieter Koch-Weser (July 13, 1916 – July 19, 2015) was a German-American physician and social medicine and HIV/AIDS researcher based in the Harvard Medical School and Harvard School of Public Health. He was a long-time advocate of Dr. Albert Schweitzer's philosophy of Reverence for Life and a supporter of the Albert Schweitzer Fellowship. He was medically noted for his HIV/AIDS research in Peru and authorization of a book on the heterosexual transmission of AIDS. In public health and healthcare, he had long advocated "a shift from treating illness to preventing it."

== Early life ==
Dieter A. Koch-Weser was born in Kassel, Germany on July 13, 1916, to Erich and Berta (Fortmann) Koch-Weser. Dieter's father was a Minister in the Democratic Weimar government. After Hitler seized power in the 1930s, his family and he left Germany and moved to Brazil, where they established a thriving coffee plantation in Rolandia, a municipality in the state of Paraná in the Southern Region of Brazil. Rolândia was settled by German immigrants who named it after (and erected a statue to) the medieval hero Roland, a symbol of freedom in Germany.

== Education ==
Dieter Koch-Weser attended medical school in Sao Paulo, Brazil, then migrated to the United States to complete an additional medical residency with the University of Chicago, and earned his Master of Science and Doctorate (Pathology) (1951) degrees from Northwestern University in Evanston, Illinois.

After receiving his PhD in Pathology, Dr. Koch-Weser became an Assistant Professor of Pulmonology at the University of Chicago where he did specialized work on tuberculosis and immunology. While in Chicago he became an American citizen.

He then moved to Cleveland, Ohio, to work as an Assistant Professor of Internal Medicine at Case-Western Reserve University where he was also Director of the University Institute for Alcoholism Research. In the early 1960s he returned to Rio de Janeiro, Brazil for two years to be Director of the Latin-American division of the U.S. National Institutes of Health. Returning to the United States he joined the faculty at Harvard Medical School under the deanship of Robert Ebert as a Professor of Tropical Public Health. During his long tenure there, he also served as Acting Chairman of the Department of Preventive and Social Medicine while Department Head Julius B. Richmond served as Surgeon General of the United States in the Carter Administration, and then Associate Dean for International Affairs. He retired from these positions at Harvard in 1983 but continued his active affiliation with the Medical School until 1996.

Dr. Koch-Weser was a vocal advocate for the extension of access to medical care to underserved populations, and developed a particular interest in the needs of the African nations struggling with the AIDS epidemic. He consulted for numerous public health agencies over the decades including WHO (World Health Organization), UNICEF, World Bank, and NIH.

In his lifetime, he published more than fifty professional papers and over a dozen books and monographs. He was also active in many professional societies, a longstanding member of International Physicians for the Prevention of Nuclear War and Amnesty International, and a supporter of the Albert Schweitzer Fellowships.

He spoke several languages fluently and estimated that over his lifetime he had visited over 90 countries around the ever-changing world of the twentieth and twenty-first centuries.

== Career ==
=== Career at Harvard ===
- Professor, Department of Social Medicine, Harvard Medical School
- Acting Chair, Department of Social Medicine, Harvard Medical School (during the years when Dr. Julius B. Richmond served in Washington, DC as Surgeon General in the Carter Administration)
- Professor, Harvard School of Public Health

=== Professional service ===
- Koch-Weser served on the Editorial Board of the American Journal of Public Health from its beginning in 1991.

== Publications ==
- Koch-Weser DA. Book Review: Preventive Primary Medicine: Reducing the major causes of mortality By Robert Lewy. October 1980. New England Journal of Medicine 303(18):1069-1070. doi:10.1056/NEJM198010303031828, Accessed June 27, 2019.
- Koch-Weser D. The Heterosexual Transmission of AIDS in Africa. Abt Books. (December 1, 1988). ISBN 978-0890116036.
- Koch-Weser D. Rifampin, New Hope in the Fight against Tuberculosis. New England Journal of Medicine. September 1970.
- Koch-Weser D. Book Review of Rifampin in the Treatment of Drug-Resistant Mycobacterium tuberculosis Infections" by Vall-Spinosa. 1970.
- Science and Brazilian development: report of a Workshop on Science and Technology to Development, Workshop held April 11–16, 1966 in Itataiai, Brazil. Conducted by the Office of the Foreign Secretary Program, National Academy of Sciences-National Research Council, Brazil-U.S. Dieter Koch-Wester, Acting Chair. Health Speaker: Dr. Ernani Braga, Chairman.
- Noble RD, Koch-Weser D, Noble EP. Glucose Metabolism by Mycobacterium Smegmatis: Evidence for the Pentose Cycle. American Review of Respiratory Diseases. Vol. 86, No. 3 | Sep 01, 1962. (Submitted May 14, 1962).
- Popper, H., Koch-Weser, D., and Szanto, P.B. Protective Effect of Vitamin B12 Upon Hepatic Injury Produced by Carbon Tetrachloride. Proc. Soc. Exper. Biol. 1954
- Koch-Weser D, Szanto PB, Farber E, Popper H. Further investigation on the effect of vitamin B12concentrate upon hepatic injury produced by carbon tetrachloride, Translational Research, 36(5),1950 (November); pp 694–704. - https://www.translationalres.com/article/0022-2143(50)90099-0/fulltext

== Publications about Dieter Koch-Weser ==
- Willich SN, Elm S (Eds). Medical Challenges for the New Millennium: An Interdisciplinary Task, 2001. Specifically see pp. vii. through xiv. and bibliography at the end.

== Personal life ==
He had lived since 1997 in North Andover, Massachusetts with his wife Sophie, who had already passed in 2010. During his teaching years they had lived also in Wellesley Hills, Massachusetts.

=== Retirement and later years ===
After retirement, Dieter and his wife Sophie moved in 1997 to the Edgewood Retirement Community in North Andover, Massachusetts in 1997, where he is known as "the Mayor" for his combination of friendly personality and commanding presence. Although not especially tall, Dieter could always be identified in a room by his lush, swept-back mane of white hair. He continued to work as a consultant at the Education Development Center (EDC) in Boston, Massachusetts, later Newton, Massachusetts, and served as an author and reviewer of professional publications until his final years.

=== Death ===
Dieter celebrated his 99th birthday at Edgewood one week before his death. He had two daughters and was predeceased by his wife, Sophie, in 2010.
