= Hessian State Museum, Kassel =

Coordinates: 51°18′39″N 9°29′23″E

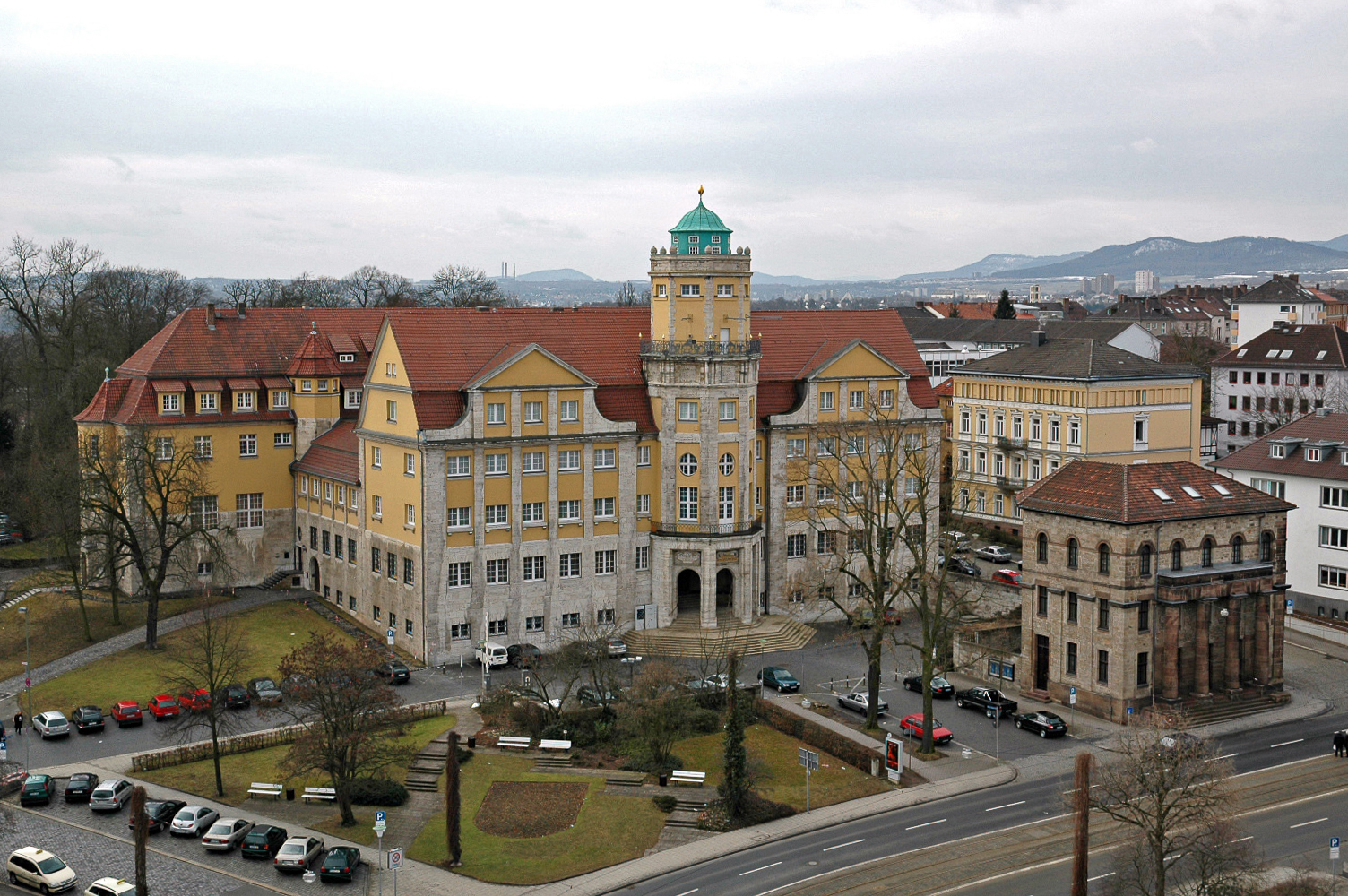
Hessian State Museum. Right: the Torwache (2005)

The Hessian State Museum (German: Hessisches Landesmuseum) is a local history museum located in Kassel, Germany. The collection ranges from the Paleolithic Age to the present. The museum is also home to the German Wallpaper Museum.

It is part of the Museumslandschaft Hessen Kassel.
