= Kassel =

- City
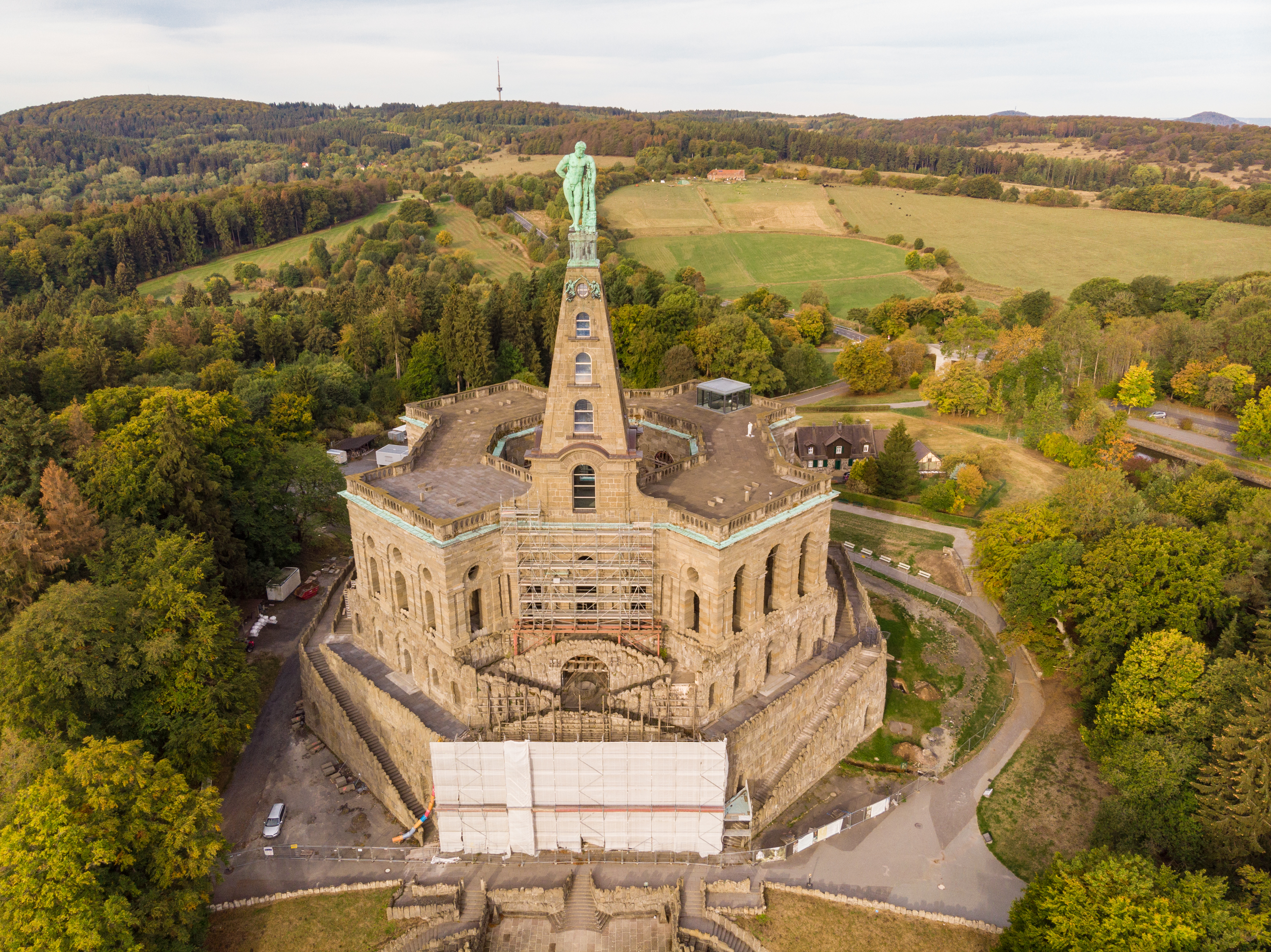
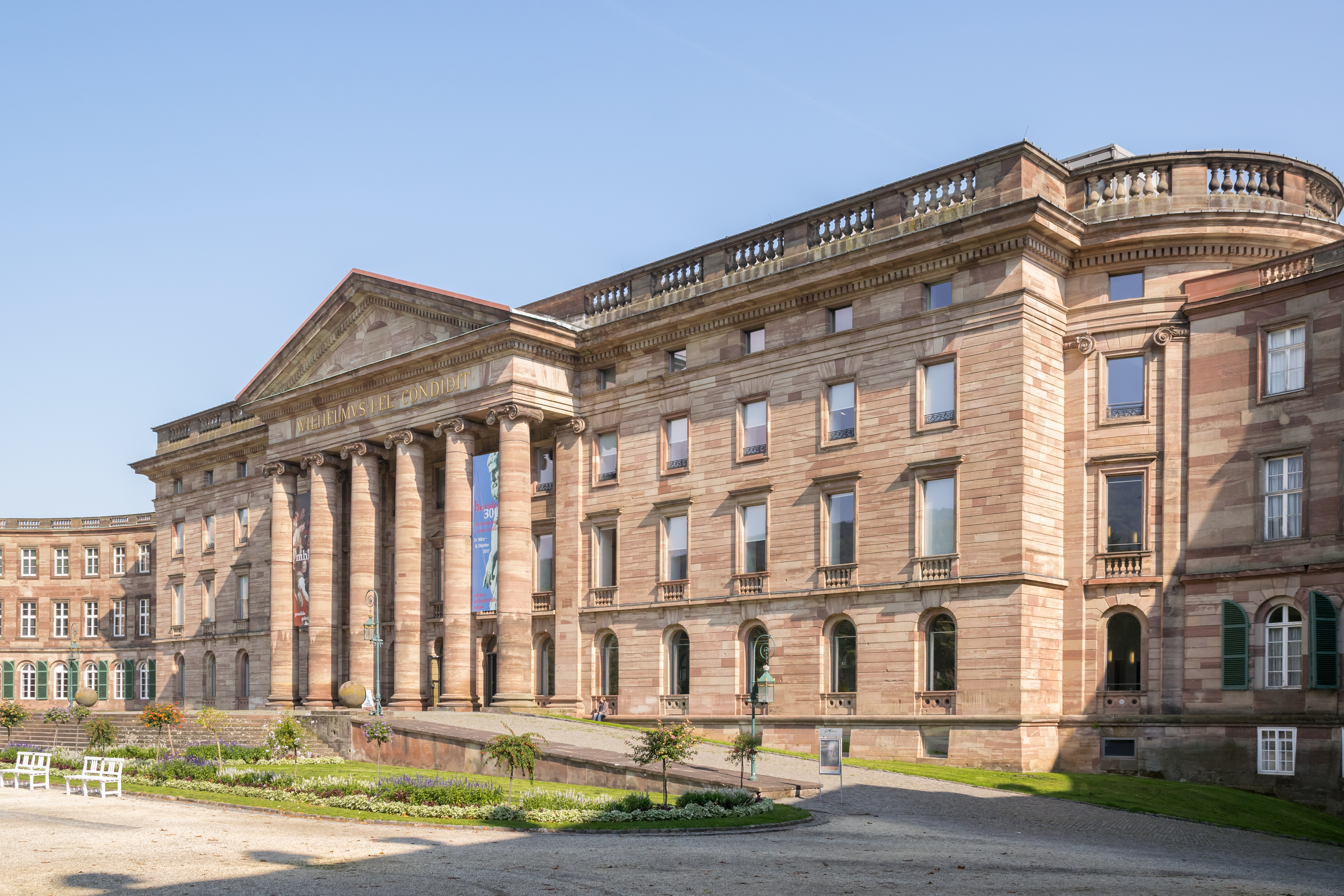
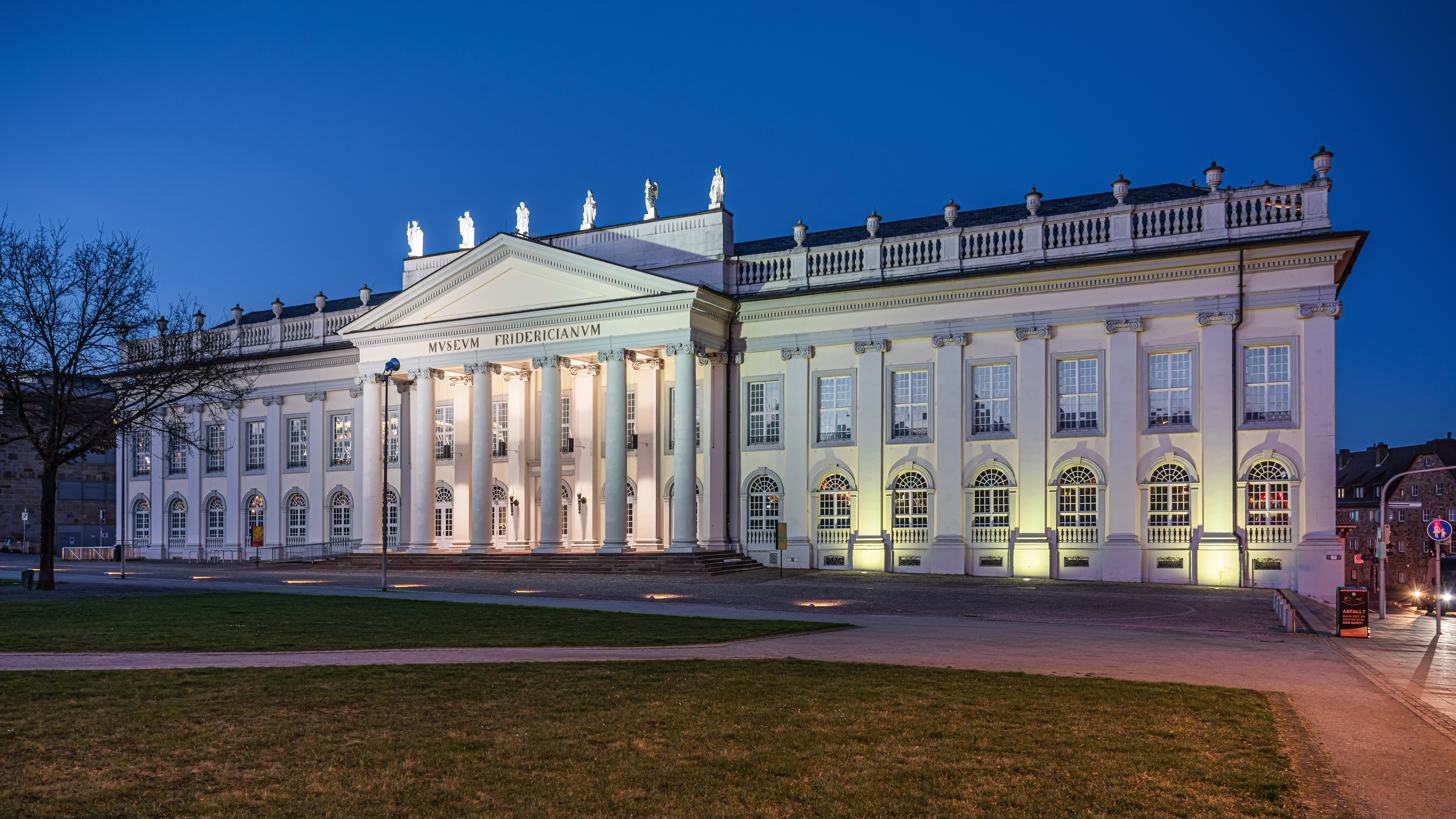
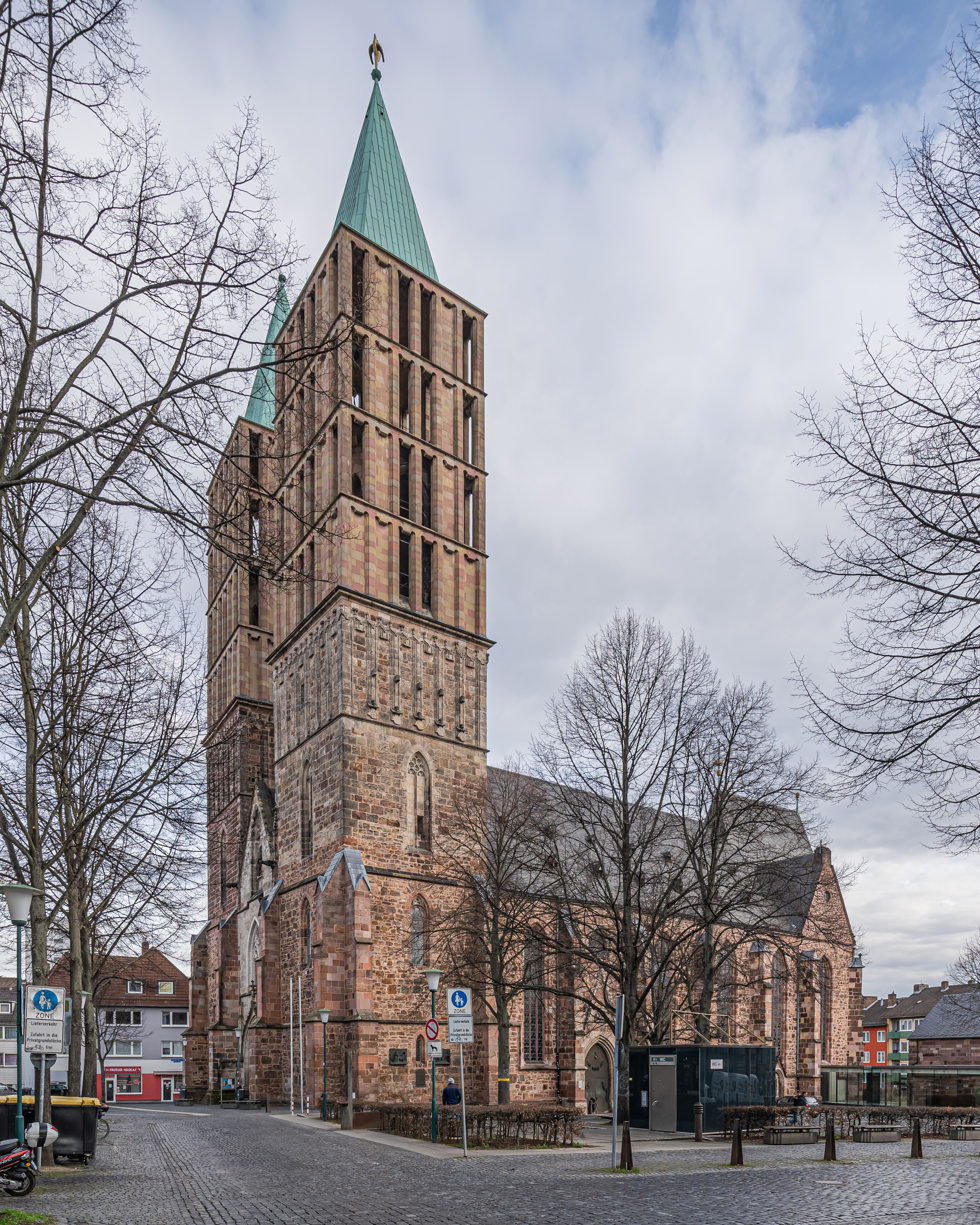
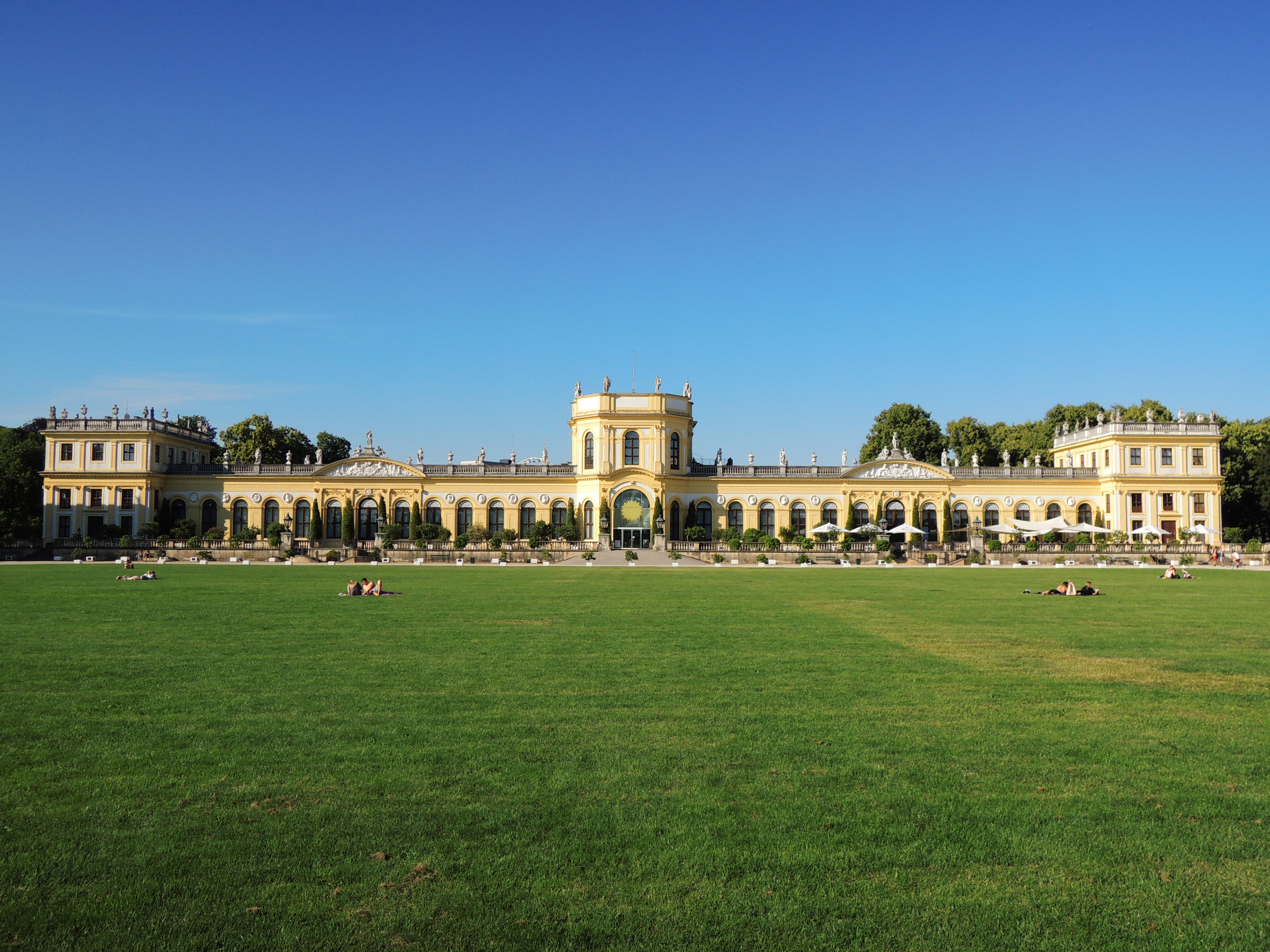
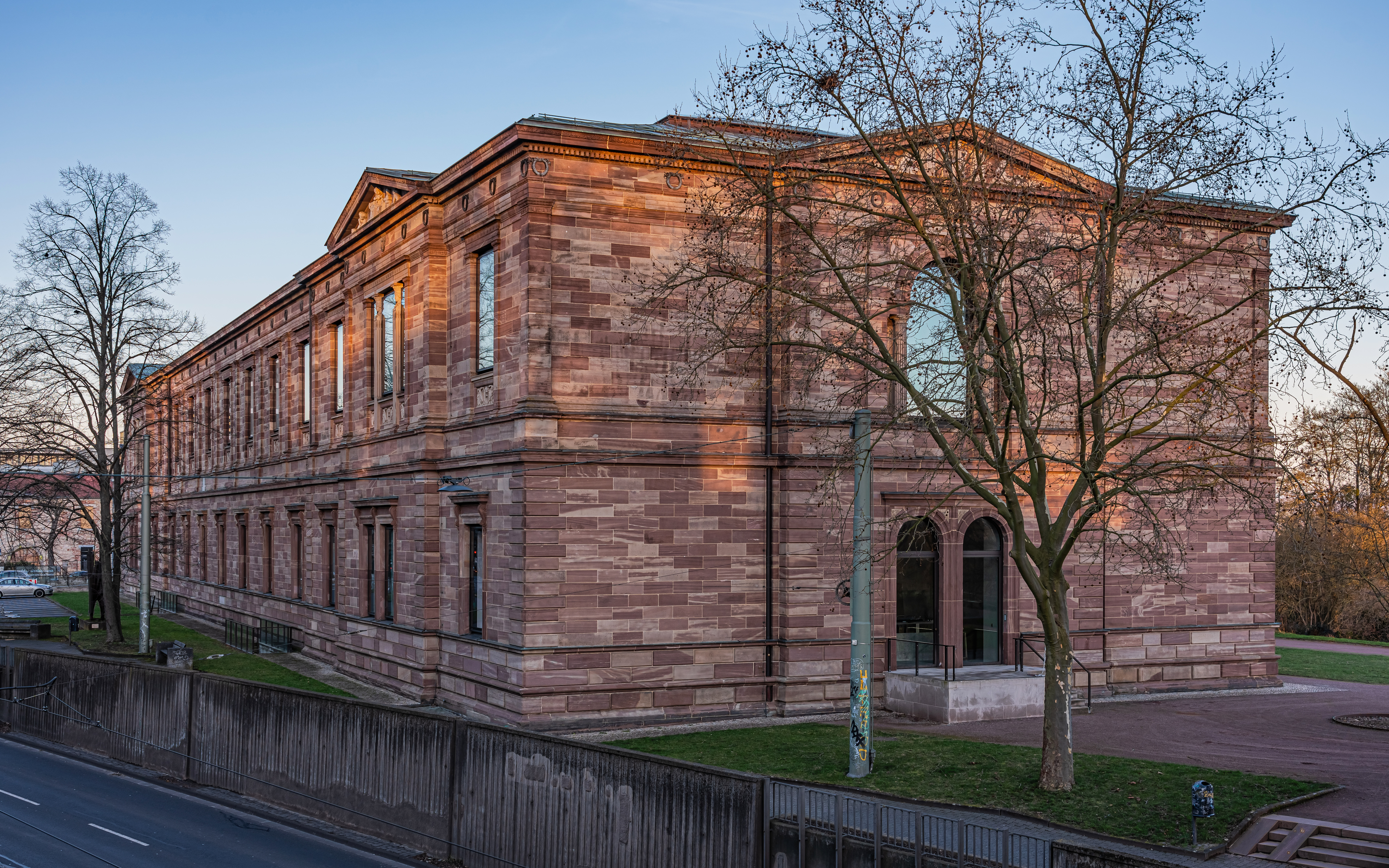
- Hercules Monument Wilhelmshöhe Palace Fridericianum St Martin's Church Orangerie New Gallery

- Flag Coat of arms
- Interactive map of Kassel
- Location within Germany Location within Hesse
- Coordinates: 51°18′57″N 9°29′52″E
- Country: Germany
- State: Hesse
- Admin. region: Kassel
- District: Urban district

Government
  - Mayor (2023–29): Sven Schoeller (Greens)

Area
  - City: 107 km^{2} (41 sq mi)
- Elevation: 167 m (548 ft)

Population (2025-12-31)
  - City: 196,799
  - Density: 1,840/km^{2} (4,760/sq mi)
  - Metro: 450,000
- Time zone: UTC+01:00 (CET)
  - Summer (DST): UTC+02:00 (CEST)
- Postal codes: 34001–34134
- Dialling codes: 0561
- Vehicle registration: KS
- Website: www.kassel.de

UNESCO World Heritage Site
- Official name: Bergpark Wilhelmshöhe
- Type: Cultural
- Criteria: (iii)(vi)
- Designated: 2013
- Reference no.: whc.unesco.org/en/list/1413

Kassel (German: [ˈkasl̩]; in Germany, spelled Cassel until 1926) is a city on the Fulda River in northern Hesse, in central Germany. It is the administrative seat of the Regierungsbezirk Kassel and the district of the same name, and had 201,048 inhabitants in December 2020. The former capital of the state of Hesse-Kassel, it has many palaces and parks, including the Bergpark Wilhelmshöhe, which is a UNESCO World Heritage Site. Kassel is also known for the documenta exhibitions of contemporary art. Kassel has a public university, the University of Kassel with 25,000 students (2018) and a multicultural population (39% of the citizens in 2017 had a migration background).

== History ==
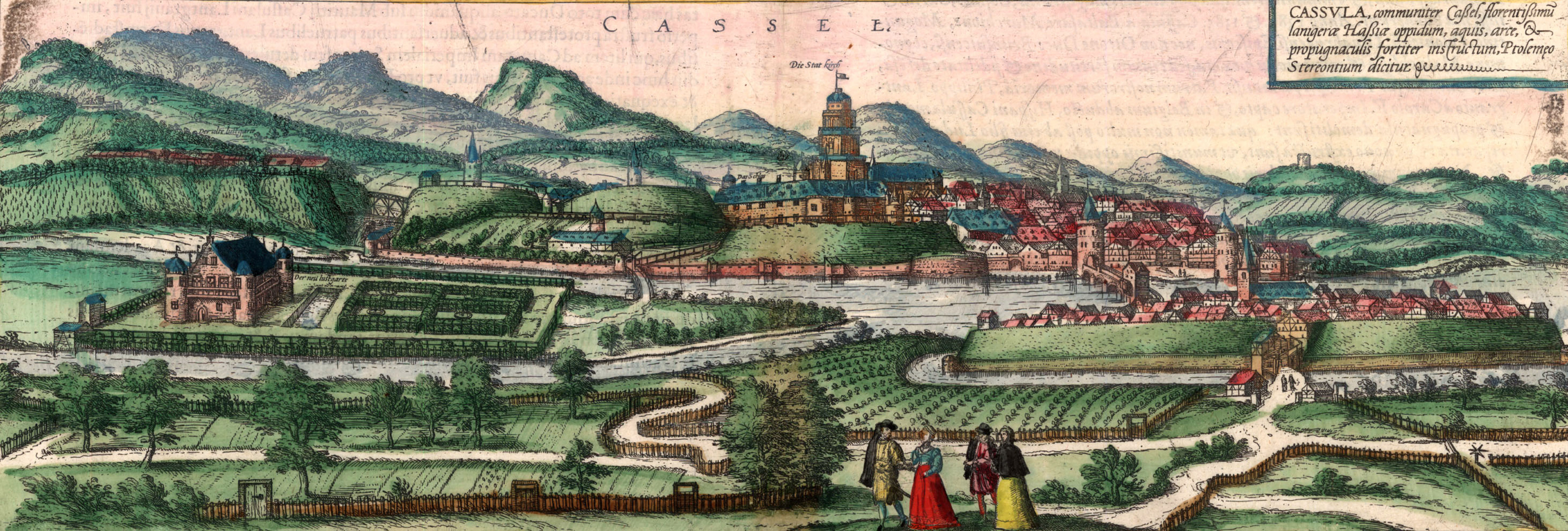
Kassel, 16th century

Kassel was first mentioned in 913 AD, as the place where two deeds were signed by King Conrad I. The place was called Chasella or Chassalla and was a fortification at a bridge crossing the Fulda river. There are several yet unproven assumptions about the origin of the name. It could be derived from the ancient Castellum Cattorum, a castle of the Chatti, a German tribe that had lived in the area since Roman times. Another assumption is a portmanteau from Frankonian cas, meaning 'valley' or 'recess', and sali meaning 'hall' or 'service building', which can be interpreted as '(town) hall in a valley'.

A deed from 1189 certifies that Cassel had city rights, but the date when they were granted is not known.

The first castle in Kassel was constructed in 1277, later replaced by a Renaissance castle, the Kassel City Palace, which burned down in 1811.

In 1567 the Landgraviate of Hesse, until then centered in Marburg, was divided among four sons, with Hesse-Kassel (or Hesse-Cassel) becoming one of its successor states. Kassel was its capital and became a centre of Calvinist Protestantism in Germany. Strong fortifications were built to protect the Protestant stronghold against Catholic enemies. Secret societies, such as Rosicrucianism, came to the rise, with Christian Rosenkreutz's work Fama Fraternitatis first published in 1617. In 1685 Kassel became a refuge for 1,700 Huguenots, who found shelter in the newly established borough of Oberneustadt. Landgrave Charles, who was responsible for this humanitarian act, also ordered the construction of the Oktogon (Hercules monument) and of the Orangerie. In the late 18th century, Hesse-Kassel became infamous for selling auxiliaries to the British crown to help suppress the American Revolution and to finance the construction of palaces and the Landgrave's opulent lifestyle.

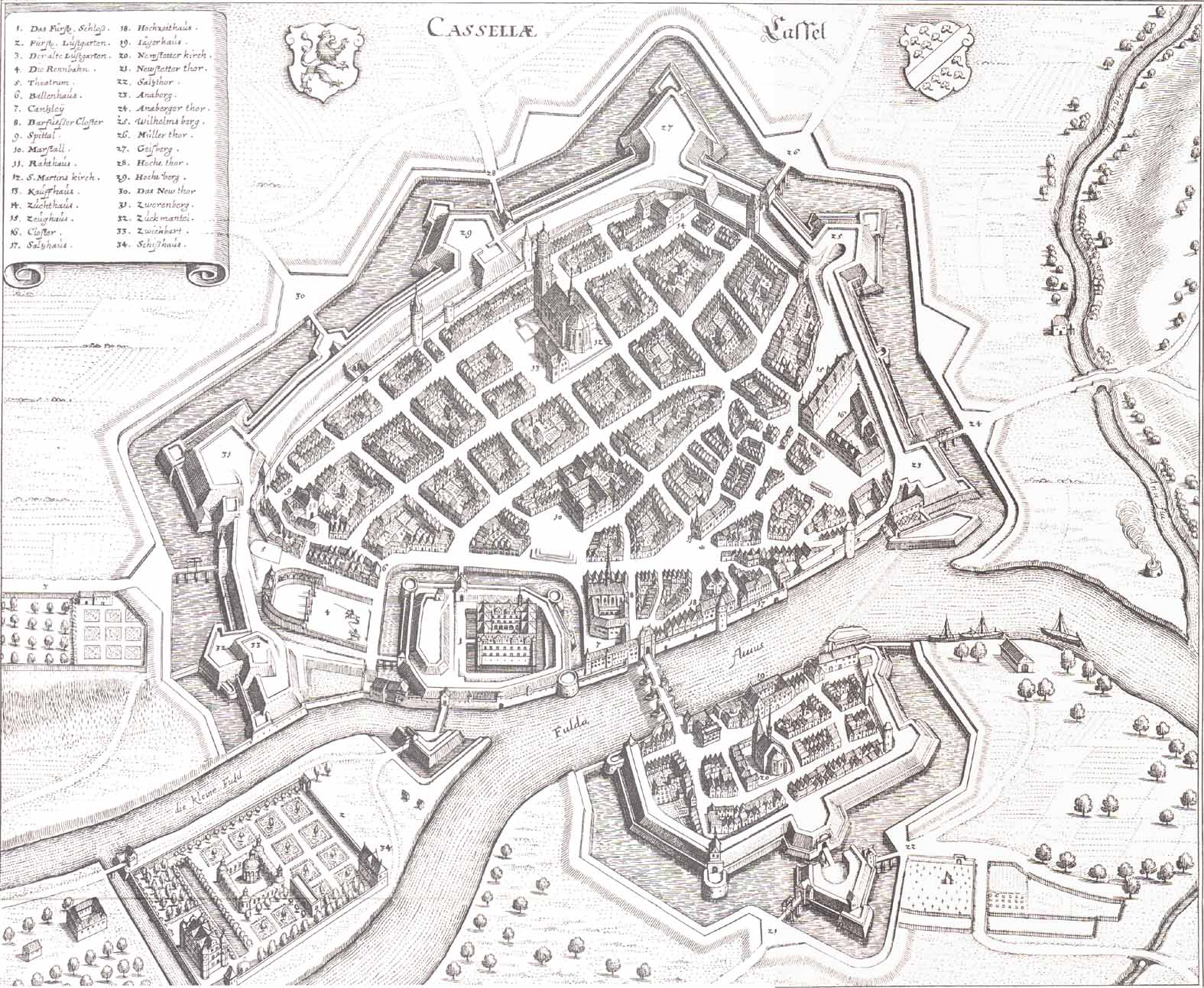
A map of Kassel in 1648

The Brothers Grimm lived in Kassel in the early 19th century, where they collected and wrote most of their fairy tales. At that time, around 1803, the Landgraviate was elevated to a Principality and its ruler to Prince-elector. Shortly after, it was annexed by Napoleon and became the capital of the short-lived Kingdom of Westphalia under Napoleon's brother Jérôme in 1807. The Electorate was restored in 1813.

Having sided with Austria in the Austro-Prussian War to gain supremacy in Germany, the principality was annexed by Prussia in 1866. The Prussian administration united Nassau, Frankfurt and Hesse-Kassel into the new Prussian province of Hesse-Nassau. Kassel ceased to be a princely residence but soon developed into a major industrial centre as well as a major railway junction. Henschel & Son, the largest railway locomotive manufacturer in Germany at the end of the nineteenth century, was based in Kassel.

In 1870, after the Battle of Sedan, Napoleon III was sent as a prisoner to the Wilhelmshöhe Palace above the city. During World War I, the German military headquarters were located in the Wilhelmshöhe Palace. In the late 1930s, Nazis destroyed Heinrich Hübsch's Kassel Synagogue.

During World War II, Kassel was the headquarters for Germany's Wehrkreis IX, and a local subcamp of Dachau concentration camp provided forced labour for the Henschel facilities, which included tank production plants. There was also a camp for Sinti and Romani people (see Romani Holocaust). Allied prisoners of war from the Stalag IX-A POW camp were deployed to forced labour in the local arms industry in violation of the Geneva Conventions. The most severe bombing of Kassel in World War II destroyed 90% of the downtown area, and some 10,000 people were killed and 150,000 were made homeless. Most of the casualties were civilians or wounded soldiers recuperating in local hospitals, whereas most factories survived the attack undamaged. Karl Gerland replaced the regional Gauleiter, Karl Weinrich, soon after the raid.

The Allied ground advance into Germany reached Kassel at the beginning of April 1945. The US 80th Infantry Division captured Kassel in house-to-house fighting during 1–4 April 1945, which included numerous German panzer-grenadier counterattacks, and resulted in further damage to bombed and unbombed structures alike.

Post-war, most of the ancient buildings in the city centre were not restored, and large parts of the inner city area were completely rebuilt in the style of the 1950s. A few historic buildings, however, such as the Museum Fridericianum, were restored.

In 1949, the interim parliament ("Parlamentarischer Rat") eliminated Kassel in the first round as a city to become the provisional capital of the Federal Republic of Germany, which the western city of Bonn won.

In 1964, the town hosted the fourth Hessentag state festival.

In 1970, the Chancellor of West Germany Willy Brandt and the prime minister of the German Democratic Republic Willy Stoph met in Wilhelmshöhe Palace for negotiations between the two German states. In 1991, the central rail station moved from "Hauptbahnhof" (main station) to "Kassel-Wilhelmshöhe", the former now being used exclusively for regional trains. The city had a dynamic economic and social development in the recent years, reducing the unemployment rate by half and attracting new citizens.

== Geography ==
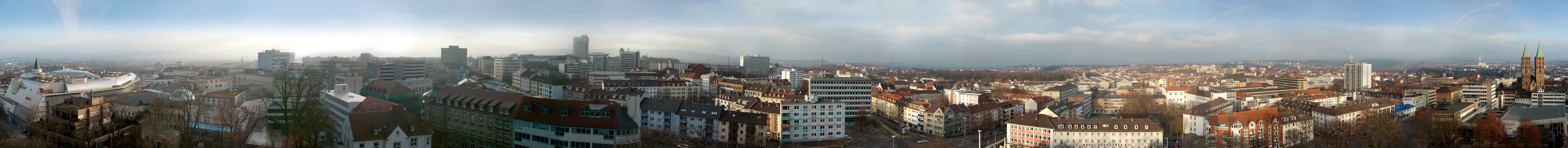
Kassel 360° panorama view from the Tower of the Lutherkirche

Kassel is the largest city in the north of the federated state of Hesse in the south-western part of Germany, about 70 kilometers northwest of the geographic center of Germany.

It is located on both sides of the river Fulda. Kassel's deepest point is in the north-eastern Fulda valley at 132.9 m above sea level.

The urban area of Kassel is divided into 23 local districts, each of which has a local council with a local mayor as chairman. The local councils are elected every five years by the population of the local districts. The local advisory board can be heard on all important issues affecting the local district. However, the final decision on a measure rests with the Kassel city council.

=== Neighboring communities ===
Around Kassel is the administrative district (Landkreis) of Landkreis Kassel. The following cities and municipalities border the city of Kassel (starting clockwise in the north): Ahnatal, Vellmar, Fuldatal, Staufenberg, Niestetal, Kaufungen, Lohfelden, Fuldabrück, Baunatal, Schauenburg, Habichtswald. Of these, Vellmar and Fuldatal in the north, Kaufungen in the east, Lohfelden in the southeast and Baunatal in the south are growing closer to the urban area.

=== Climate ===
Kassel experiences an oceanic climate (Köppen: Cfb) close to marine climates, with a more notable continental influence than Berlin. Using the 1961–1990 normal and 0 °C isotherm, the city already had a humid continental climate (Dfb).

Climate data for Kassel (1991–2020 normals)
Month	Jan	Feb	Mar	Apr	May	Jun	Jul	Aug	Sep	Oct	Nov	Dec	Year
Record high °C (°F)	13.3 (55.9)	17.0 (62.6)	24.8 (76.6)	30.1 (86.2)	30.0 (86.0)	32.5 (90.5)	35.1 (95.2)	35.2 (95.4)	32.5 (90.5)	26.9 (80.4)	20.7 (69.3)	14.8 (58.6)	35.2 (95.4)
Mean daily maximum °C (°F)	3.1 (37.6)	4.5 (40.1)	9.2 (48.6)	14.4 (57.9)	18.6 (65.5)	21.3 (70.3)	23.6 (74.5)	23.6 (74.5)	18.8 (65.8)	13.3 (55.9)	7.2 (45.0)	3.5 (38.3)	13.4 (56.1)
Daily mean °C (°F)	0.9 (33.6)	1.4 (34.5)	5.0 (41.0)	9.3 (48.7)	13.4 (56.1)	16.1 (61.0)	18.3 (64.9)	17.9 (64.2)	13.8 (56.8)	9.2 (48.6)	4.8 (40.6)	1.3 (34.3)	9.3 (48.7)
Mean daily minimum °C (°F)	−1.6 (29.1)	−1.4 (29.5)	1.2 (34.2)	4.4 (39.9)	8.4 (47.1)	11.1 (52.0)	13.3 (55.9)	13.0 (55.4)	9.5 (49.1)	5.9 (42.6)	2.3 (36.1)	−0.9 (30.4)	5.5 (41.9)
Record low °C (°F)	−19.7 (−3.5)	−19.9 (−3.8)	−15.6 (3.9)	−7.4 (18.7)	−2.7 (27.1)	1.2 (34.2)	4.6 (40.3)	4.4 (39.9)	0.9 (33.6)	−2.9 (26.8)	−12.0 (10.4)	−19.4 (−2.9)	−19.9 (−3.8)
Average precipitation mm (inches)	53.8 (2.12)	46.6 (1.83)	51.6 (2.03)	39.7 (1.56)	69.1 (2.72)	67.6 (2.66)	74.4 (2.93)	60.1 (2.37)	56.2 (2.21)	58.4 (2.30)	61.3 (2.41)	68.2 (2.69)	706.6 (27.82)
Average precipitation days (≥ 1.0 mm)	16.6	16.0	16.0	13.3	14.7	14.2	15.7	14.5	13.5	16.0	18.7	20.1	188.5
Average relative humidity (%)	85.0	81.8	75.7	68.5	70.6	71.4	71.9	71.7	78.5	84.5	87.5	87.7	77.9
Mean monthly sunshine hours	45.3	66.8	119.8	169.5	196.8	201.4	204.2	192.4	144.1	98.9	38.9	35.2	1,515.1
Source: World Meteorological Organization

== Culture ==
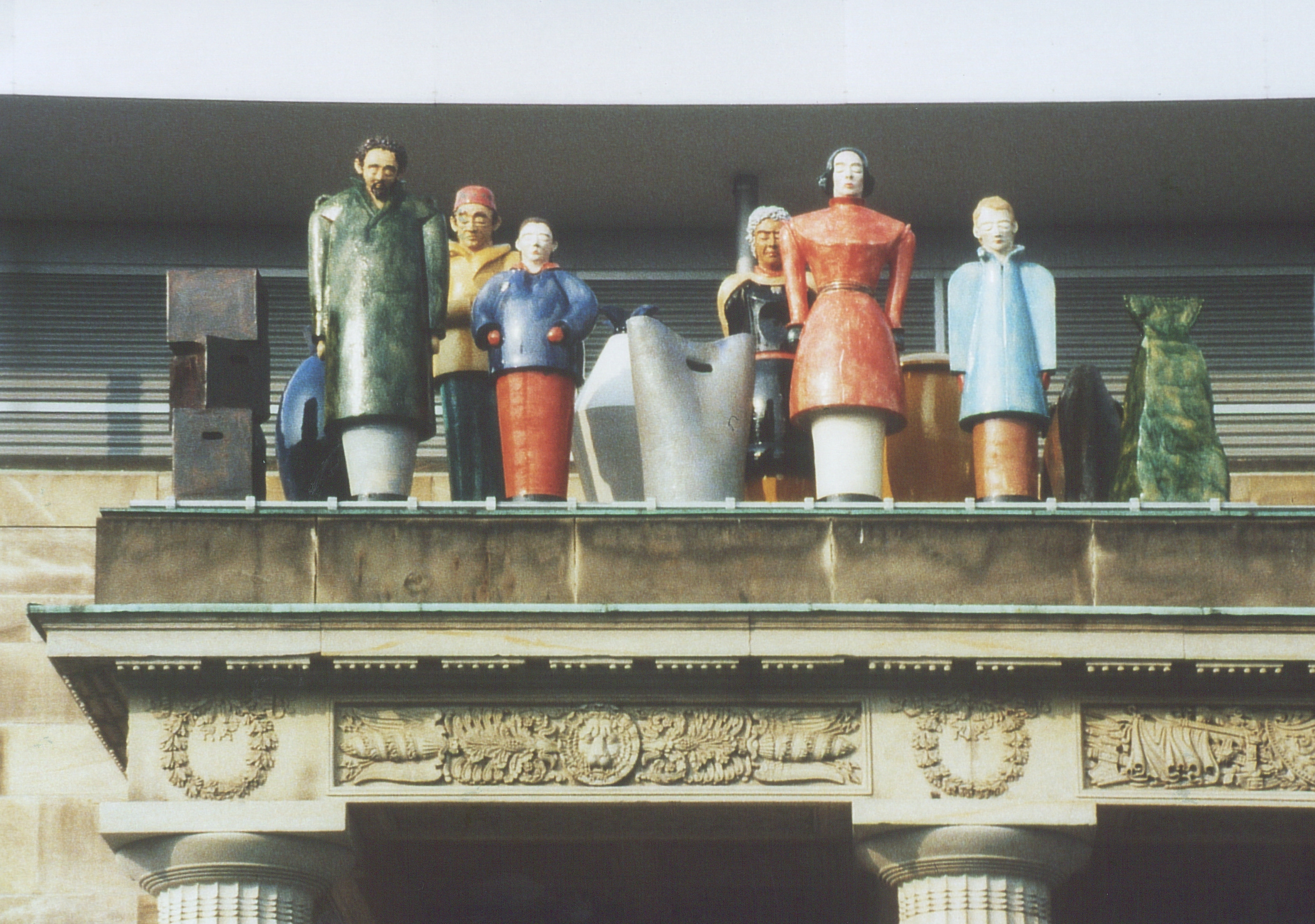
Installation by Thomas Schütte on the portico of the former Residenzpalais during Documenta IX, 1992

The first German observatory was built in Kassel in 1558, and a later version from 1714 survives as the Bellevue Palace. The Ottoneum, the first permanent German theatre building, was built in 1606. The old building is today the Natural History Museum, and the now-called Staatstheater Kassel is located in a nearby building that was constructed in the 1950s. Since 1927, Kassel has been home to Bärenreiter, a music publishing house distributing compositions of several critically acclaimed classical musicians.

Since 1955 the documenta, an international exhibition of modern and contemporary art, has been held regularly in Kassel. The documenta now takes place every five years. As a result of the documenta 6 in 1977, Kassel became the first city in the world to be illuminated by laser beams at night (Laserscape, by artist Horst H. Baumann). This laser installation is nowadays still visible at weekends. Artworks from former editions of the documenta (mainly sculptures) can be found in multiple places in Kassel; among those are the "7000 Oaks", a work of land art by the German artist Joseph Beuys. The latest/current edition of the documenta, known as "documenta 15", ran from 18 June until 25 September 2022.

Literature flourished in Kassel in the 19th century, when intellectuals gathered around the Brothers Grimm. Successful contemporary authors include Sebastian Mense ("Keilsberg") and Maria Knissel ("Letzte Meile").

== Demographics ==
Historical population
Year	Pop.	±%
1472	4,500	—
1626	6,329	+40.6%
1773	17,311	+173.5%
1871	46,362	+167.8%
1900	106,034	+128.7%
1919	162,391	+53.1%
1925	171,483	+5.6%
1933	175,179	+2.2%
1939	216,141	+23.4%
1943	225,694	+4.4%
1945	71,209	−68.4%
1950	162,132	+127.7%
1956	191,935	+18.4%
1961	207,507	+8.1%
1966	213,084	+2.7%
1971	215,039	+0.9%
1976	201,705	−6.2%
1981	194,779	−3.4%
1986	185,370	−4.8%
1991	196,828	+6.2%
1996	200,927	+2.1%
2001	194,718	−3.1%
2011	190,765	−2.0%
2022	195,012	+2.2%
2024	197,230	+1.1%
Population size may be affected by changes in administrative divisions. Source:

Kassel has a population of about 200,000, and is the 3rd largest city in Hesse state and the only large city in the North Hesse region.

Kassel is often called the city that located on the center of Germany due to its position.

Kassel first reached its first population peak of over 100,000 in 1899, and its second in 1943 with about 225,000. Kassel was destroyed during World War II and became an industrial city in 1950s. Today, Kassel is home to multiple companies and universities.

Rank	Nationality	Population (31 December 2022)
1	Turkey	7,343
2	Ukraine	4,579
3	Syria	4,369
4	Bulgaria	3,446
5	Poland	2,152
6	Italy	1,531
7	Romania	1,451
8	Croatia	1,370
9	Somalia	1,305
10	Afghanistan	1,235

== Sights ==
The bombing raids of 1943 destroyed 90% of the city center. The city center was almost completely rebuilt during the 1950s and is a combination of renovated or reconstructed old buildings and architecture of the 1950s. Outside the city center, the suburbs are dominated by 19th-century architecture. Timber-framed old towns are situated in suburbs like Harleshausen and Bad Wilhelmshöhe. The oldest monument is the Druselturm; the Brüderkirche and the Martinskirche are also, in part, of medieval origin. The towers of the Martinskirche are from the 1950s, but much of the original towers remain inside the new framing, which is enclosing them.

=== Churches ===
==== St. Martin, Kassel ====
The main Protestant church of Kassel, it was begun in 1364 and finished in 1462. Severely damaged by British bombing in 1943, it was later reconstructed in a more modern style between 1954 and 1958.

==== St. Bonifatius, Kassel ====
St. Bonifatius was designed and built in 1956 by Josef Bieling.

=== Bergpark Wilhelmshöhe ===
The complex includes Wilhelmshöhe Palace (with the Antiquities Collection and Old Masters), the Hercules monument, and the Lions Castle. Wilhelmshöhe Palace above the city was built in 1786, by landgrave Wilhelm IX of Hesse-Kassel. The palace is now a museum and houses an important collection of Graeco-Roman antiques and a fine gallery of paintings comprising the second largest collection of Rembrandts in Germany. It is surrounded by the beautiful Bergpark Wilhelmshöhe with many appealing sights. The complex was named a UNESCO World Heritage Site in 2013.

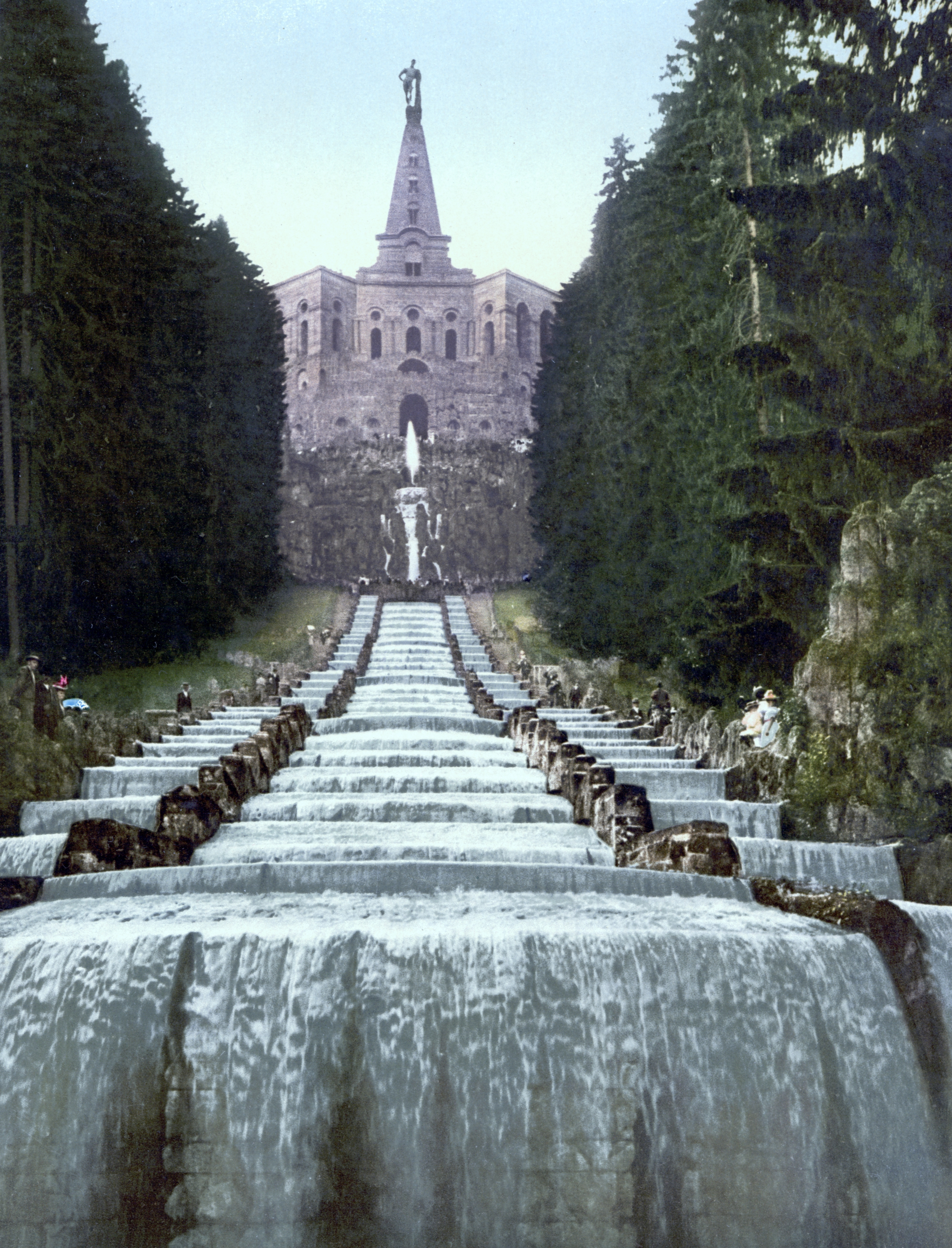
Herkules Monument and water running down the cascades during the water features in the Bergpark of the Wilhelmshöhe Palace

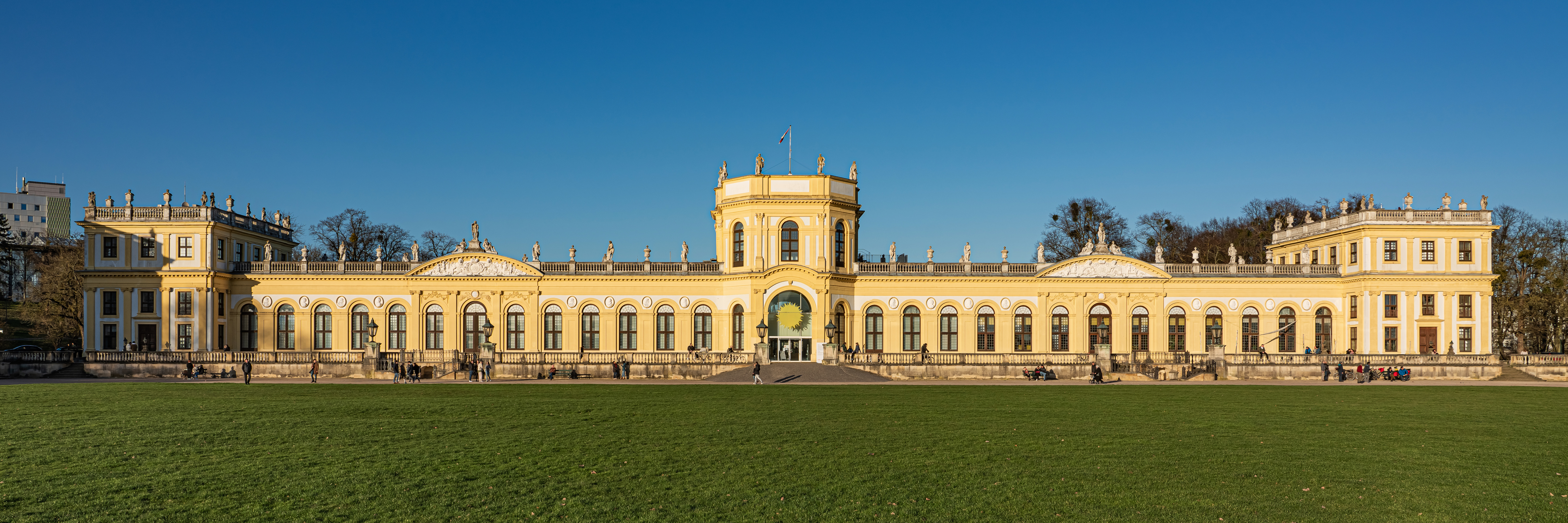
The Orangerie in the Karlsaue park

The Hercules monument is a huge octagonal stone structure carrying a giant replica of Hercules "Farnese" (now at Museo Archeologico Nazionale in Naples, Italy). From its base down to Wilhelmshöhe Palace runs a long set of artificial cascades. Every Sunday and Wednesday afternoon at 14:30 (from May until October), the famous water features take place, which start at the Oktagon, and during a one-hour walk through the park visitors can follow the water's way until they reach the lake of the Wilhelmshöhe Palace, where a fountain of about 50 metres (160 ft) marks the end of the features.

The Löwenburg ("Lions Castle") is a replica of a medieval scottish style castle, also built during the reign of Wilhelm IX. Much had to be rebuilt after bombing in II WW. After the Franco-Prussian War of 1870–71, Napoléon III was imprisoned in Wilhelmshöhe. In 1918, Wilhelmshöhe became the seat of the German Army High Command (OHL); it was there that the military commanders Hindenburg and Ludendorff prepared the German capitulation.

=== Staatspark Karlsaue (Karlsaue Park) ===
The Karlsaue is a large park along the Fulda River that is part of the European Garden Heritage Network. Established in the 16th century, it is known for the Orangerie, a palace built in 1710 as a summer residence for the landgraves. Today, the Orangerie contains the Museum of Astronomy and Technology, with a scale model of the Solar System spanning the entire park and beyond. In addition, the Park Schönfeld contains a small, municipal botanical garden, the Botanischer Garten Kassel.

=== Art museums ===
Europe's first public museum, the Museum Fridericianum, was founded in 1779. By the end of the 19th century, the museum held one of the largest collections of watches and clocks in the world. Other art museums in Kassel include:

- Wilhelmshöhe Palace (Antiquities Collection and Old Masters: Albrecht Dürer, Rubens, Rembrandt, Frans Hals, Anthony van Dyck)
- New Gallery (Tischbein family, Joseph Beuys)
- Hessisches Landesmuseum (with a world-famous wallpaper collection).

=== Other museums ===
- Museum of Natural History (in the Ottoneum building)
- Museum of physics and astronomy in the Orangerie
- Marmorbad (marble bath) in the Orangerie
- Caricatura (in the Hauptbahnhof Kassel)
- Museum of Local History
- Tram Museum Kassel
- Technical Museum and Henschel Museum
- Louis Spohr Museum (classical music composer) Museum in the Bellevue Palace, remaining part of the Bellevueschloss palace complex
- Museum for Sepulchral Culture (unique in Germany)
- Museum for historical walpapers and tapestry
- Museum of the Brothers Grimm (known as Grimmwelt Kassel)
- Museum of Modern Art, part of (Neue Gallerie)
- Gemäldegallerie Kassel in the Wilhelmshöhe Palace (Schloss Wilhelmshöhe)
- Botanical Island (Insel Siebenbergen)

== Politics ==
=== Mayor ===
The current mayor of Kassel is Sven Schoeller of Alliance 90/The Greens, who was elected in March 2023. He succeeded Christian Geselle (SPD), who had been in office since 2017.

=== City council ===
Winning party by district in the 2021 city council election

The Kassel city council (Stadtverordnetenversammlung) governs the city alongside the Mayor. The most recent city council election was held on 14 March 2021, and the results were as follows:

Party	Lead candidate	Votes	%	+/-	Seats	+/-
Alliance 90/The Greens (Grüne)	Awet Tesfaiesus	1,201,167	28.7	▲10.7	20	▲7
Social Democratic Party (SPD)	Patrick Hartmann	1,028,529	24.6	▼4.9	17	▼4
Christian Democratic Union (CDU)	Michael von Rüden	802,551	19.2	▼1.5	14	▼1
Kasseler Left (Left)	Violetta Bock	469,800	11.2	▲0.6	8	▲1
Free Democratic Party (FDP)	Matthias Nölke	236,057	5.6	0.0	4	±0
Alternative for Germany (AfD)	Sven Dreyer	233,609	5.6	▼5.4	4	▼4
Free Voters (FW)	Christian Klobuczynski	94,443	2.3	▼0.7	2	±0
Save the Bees	Bernd Hoppe	77,703	1.9	New	1	New
Die PARTEI (PARTEI)	Jennifer Rieger	41,169	1.0	New	1	New
Valid votes		61,687	95.7			
Invalid votes		2,765	4.3			
Total		64,452	100.0		71	±0
Electorate/voter turnout		147,462	43.7	▲0.9		
Source: Statistics Hesse

== Economy ==
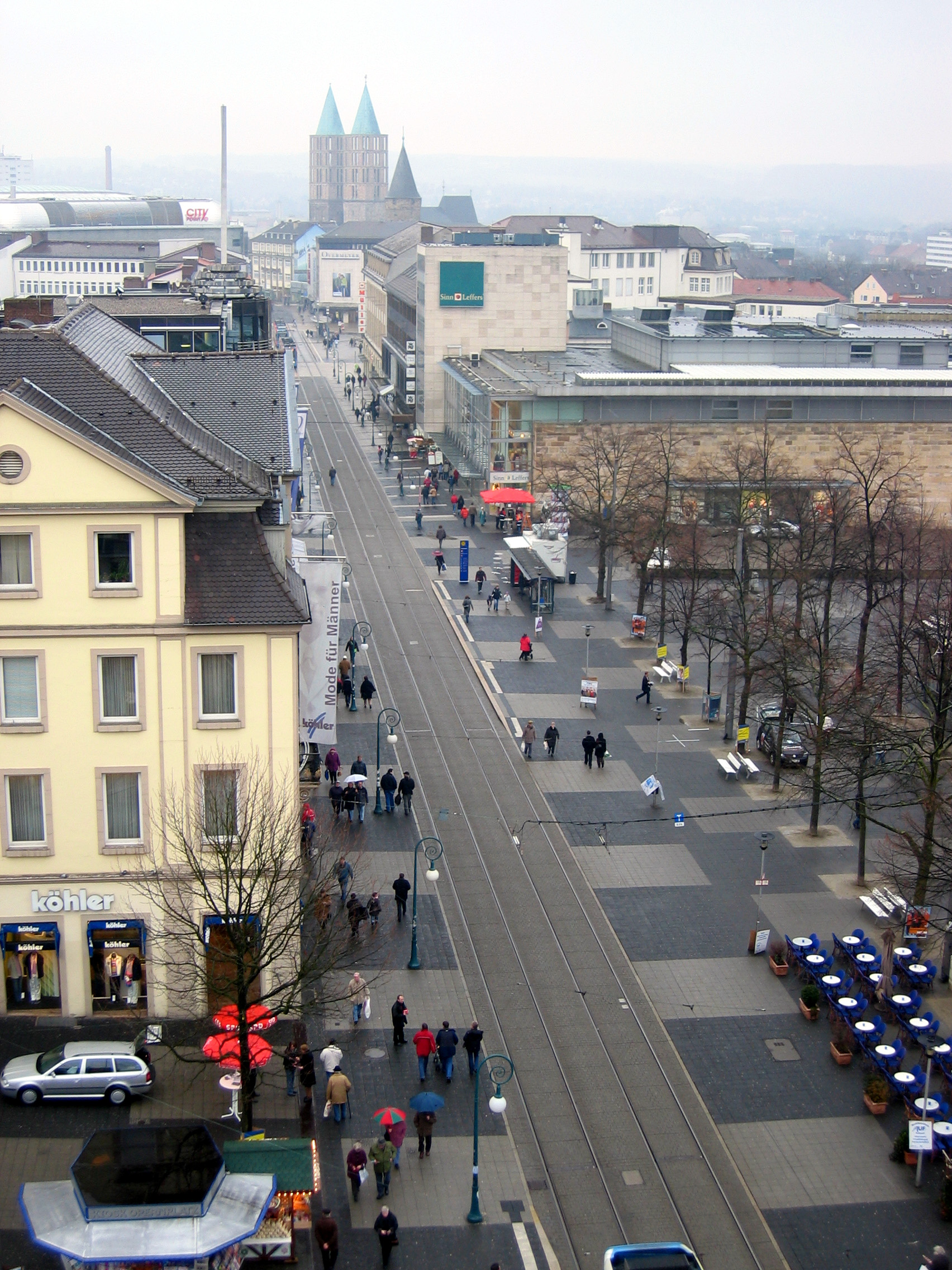
Königsstrasse, the main shopping street

Several international operating companies have factories or headquarters in the city (Volkswagen, Mercedes Benz, SMA, Wintershall, Krauss-Maffei Wegmann, Rheinmetall, Bombardier). The city is home to several hospitals; the public Klinikum Kassel is one of the largest hospitals in Hesse.

== Transport ==
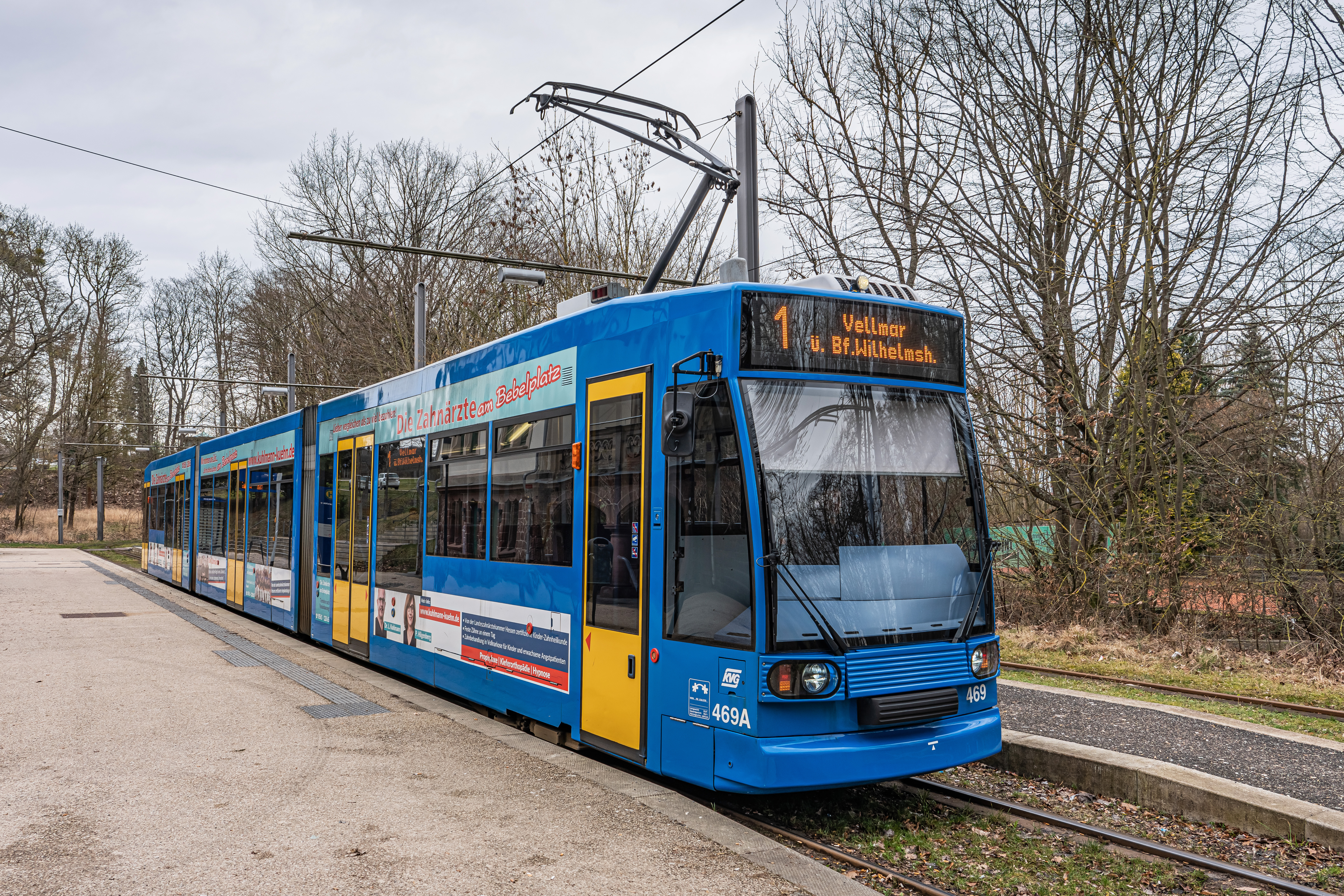
A tram in Kassel

Kassel has seven tram lines (1, 3, 4, 5, 6, 7, 8), with trams arriving usually every 15 minutes. The city also operates a light rail Stadtbahn network called RegioTram using Regio Citadis low-floor trams which run on both tram and main line railway tracks with three lines (RT1, RT4, RT5). Moreover, a number of low-floor buses complete the Kassel public transport system. The introduction of low-floor buses led to the development of the Kassel kerb which improves the accessibility at bus stops.

The city is connected to the national rail network at two stations, Kassel Central, and Kassel-Wilhelmshöhe. The traditional central station (Hauptbahnhof) has been reduced to the status of a regional station since the opening of the Hanover-Würzburg high-speed rail line in 1991 and its station (Kassel-Wilhelmshöhe) on the high-speed line at which the InterCityExpress (ICE) and InterCity services call as well as Nightjet and Flixtrain.

Kassel is connected to the motorways A 7, A 49 and A 44.

The city is served by Kassel Calden Airport. However, the airport only provides routes to limited destinations. The nearest airports to Kassel are Paderborn Lippstadt Airport, Hannover Airport, Dortmund Airport and Frankfurt Airport.

== Education and research ==
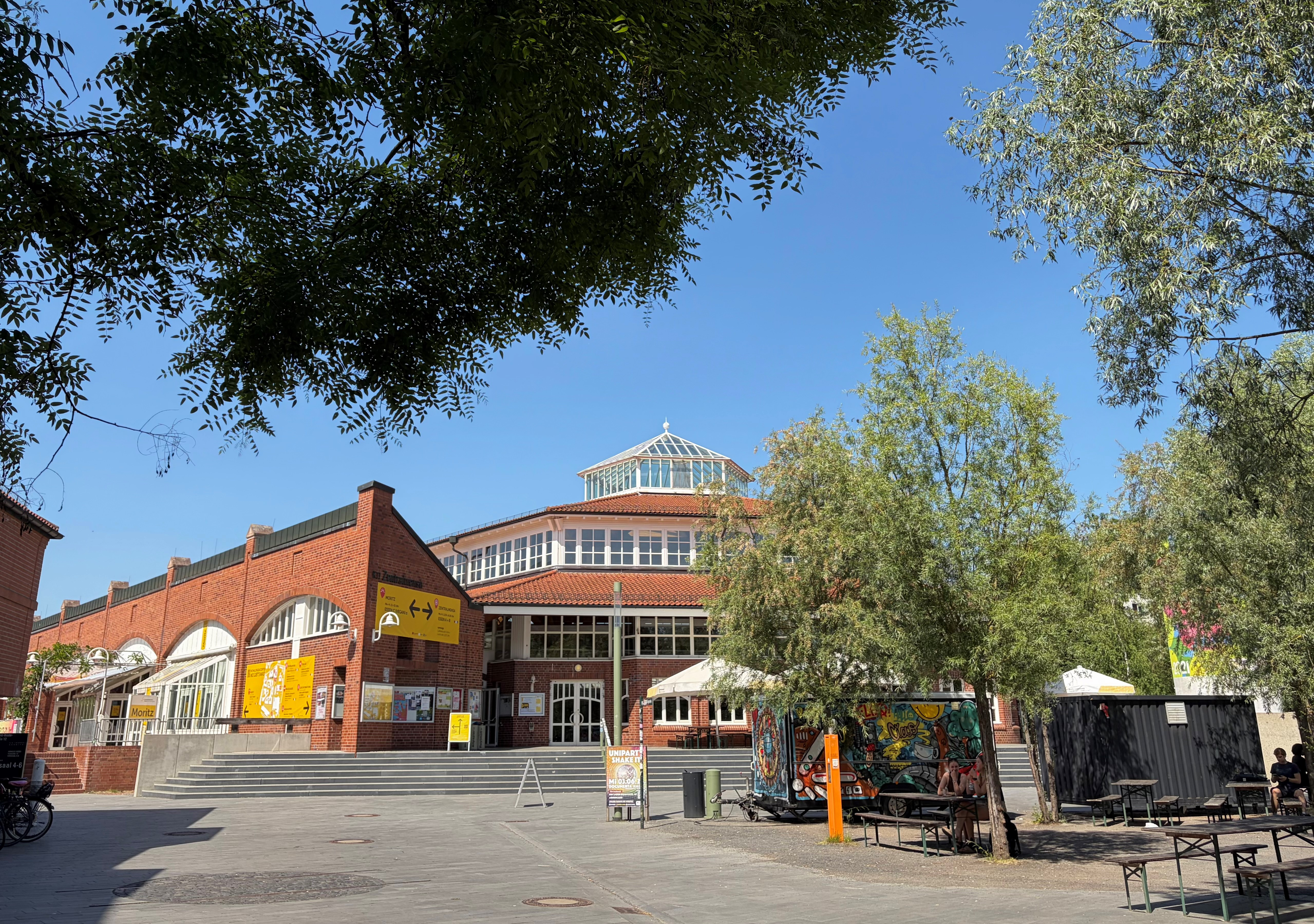
University of Kassel

=== University of Kassel ===
The University of Kassel is a public higher education institution and was founded in 1971. It is the most recently established university in the state of Hessen and is distinguished by its urban campus, located between the city center and the Northern city district. Around 21,000 students are currently enrolled, including 3,357 international students (2026).

The university offers a range of study programmes, including several English-language master's programmes as well as two short-term international programs, the Summer University and the Winter University.

=== Academic profile ===
Research and teaching at the university includes key areas such as environmental, climate and energy research, information technology design, nanostructure sciences and educational research. The University has received numerous awards for innovative projects and regularly performs well in national academic rankings and teaching awards. For example, its Civil Engineering programme has repeatedly achieved top results in the CHE University Ranking published by the ZEIT Studienführer, while the university has also been recognised in the Hessian Higher Education Award for Excellence in Teaching.

In 2024, the university strengthened its focus on sustainability by introducing new degree programmes and establishing a new institute.

=== Campus locations ===
In addition to its main campus at Holländischer Platz, the University of Kassel has further sites on Heinrich-Plett-Straße, Wilhelmshöher Allee and Damaschkestraße in Kassel, as well as two sites in the town of Witzenhausen. The Kunsthochschule Kassel (University of Fine Arts) is also part of the university with a satellite campus directly at the Karlsaue park in the Southern city district.

=== Research ===
The University of Kassel has traditionally maintained a broad and interdisciplinary research profile. In recent years, the university has defined two key research areas: Materials Science and Sustainable Transformations. As part of its sustainability strategy, the university is currently establishing the Kassel Institute for Sustainability.

Research at the University of Kassel is frequently organised in an interdisciplinary manner. This is particularly reflected in its four central research institutes: INCHER-Kassel focuses on higher education and research policy, ITeG specialises in socially responsible technology design, the Kassel Institute for Sustainability conducts research on sustainability and transformation, and CINSaT is dedicated to nanoscience and nanotechnology.

=== Other institutions ===
- Kassel School of Medicine (KSM)
- YMCA University of Applied Sciences (CVJM-Hochschule)
- Fraunhofer-Institut für Energiewirtschaft und Energiesystemtechnik (IEE)
- Fraunhofer-Institut für Bauphysik (IBP) Projektgruppe Kassel

== Associations ==
- Volksbund Deutsche Kriegsgräberfürsorge German War Graves Commission
- Gesellschaft für Christlich-Jüdische Zusammenarbeit Kassel
- Spitzenverband der landwirtschaftlichen Sozialversicherung
- Deutsche Rentenversicherung Hessen
- Industrie- und Handelskammer Kassel (Chamber of Commerce Kassel)

== Courts ==
Several courts are located in Kassel, including:

- the Federal Social Court (Bundessozialgericht)
- Hessischer Verwaltungsgerichtshof (Administration Court of Hesse)
- Fiscal Court Hesse (Finanzgericht)
- Sozialgericht Kassel (Social Court Kassel)
- Arbeitsgericht Kassel (Employment Court Kassel)
- Verwaltungsgericht Kassel
- Oberlandesgericht Frankfurt/Main in Kassel
- Landgericht Kassel (Regional Court Kassel)
- Amtsgericht Kassel and Staatsanwaltschaft Kassel (Local Court Kassel)

== Sports ==
Hessen Kassel is the football club in the city, who plays in the Hessenliga after being relegated from the Regionalliga Südwest in the 2017/2018 season. The city's own football stadium, the Auestadion was built in 1953 and is able to hold 18,737 people. It is located in the south of Kassel at the quarter Südstadt, next to the Karlsaue.

Kassel has a long ice hockey tradition, but it was not until 1977 that the Kassel ice rink (Eissporthalle) opened on a private initiative. The Kassel Huskies were founding members of the DEL in 1994, belonging to the league from 1994 to 2006 and again from 2008 to 2010. In 1997, they were runners-up in the championship playoffs, losing to Adler Mannheim, and reached the semi-finals on three more occasions. The Huskies ran into financial difficulties and dissolved in 2010. The "Young Huskies", which is a junior and youth hockey club, decided to enter a men's team in the Hessenliga. This is the fifth division and the lowest men's competition in the state of Hesse. The new club was expecting no more than 3,000 supporters for the first home game in the Hessenliga. However, they had over 5,000 supporters come to watch.

== Notable people ==
=== Academia ===
- Helmut Hasse (1898–1979), fundamental theorist in algebra and number theory
- Dieter Koch-Weser (1916–2015), professor, Harvard Medical School and Harvard School of Public Health
- Franz Rosenzweig (1886–1929), Jewish-German theologian, philosopher and translator
- Georg Friedrich Sartorius (1765–1828), academia, research historian and economist

=== Actors and entertainment ===
- Daniel Bandmann (1837–1905), actor-manager
- Doris Devrient (1801–1882), actress and singer.
- Christine Genast (1798–1860), actress, singer and pianist.
- Hubertus Meyer-Burckhardt (born 1956), television journalist and talk show host
- F. W. Murnau (1888–1931), movie director in the silent era
- Barbara Rudnik (1958–2009), actress
- Otto Sander (1941–2013), actor
- Meryem Sahra Uzerli (born 1983), Turkish-German actress

=== Artists and designers ===
- Arnold Bode (1900–1977), architect, painter, designer, and founder of the documenta
- Simon Louis du Ry (1726–1799), architect
- Hugo Wilhelm Arthur Nahl (1833–1899), artist who designed the Seal of California
- Albrecht Rosengarten (1809–1893), architect famous for synagogue buildings in Central Europe
- Richard Cassels (1690 – 1751), architect

=== Business ===
- Georges Kugelmann (1809–1882), newspaper printer
- Horst Paulmann (born 1935), German-Chilean billionaire entrepreneur, and founder and chairman of Cencosud

=== Musicians ===
- Franz Curti (1854–1898), opera composer
- Andreas Dippel (1866–1932), operatic tenor
- Chris Hülsbeck (born 1968), video game music composer
- Gertrud Elisabeth Mara (1749–1833), operatic soprano
- Israel Meyer Japhet (1818–1892) choral director in Frankfurt am Main
- Louis Spohr (1784–1859), composer and violinist, commemorated by a museum in the city
- Charlotte Sporleder (1836–1915), composer
- Johannes von Soest (1448–1506), medieval musician, music theorist, poet, and composer
- Milky Chance (2013–present), band

=== Politicians, military and civil servants ===
- Holger Börner (1931–2006), politician
- Hans Eichel (born 1941), politician
- Werner von Fichte (1896–1955), SA general and police chief
- Philipp Scheidemann (1865–1939), briefly Germany's Chancellor after the First World War
- Josias von Heeringen (1850–1926), general
- Heinrich von Porbeck, major general, died at the Battle of Talavera (1809)
- Johanna Vogt (1862–1944), suffragette and the first woman on the city council of Kassel starting in 1919
- Kay-Achim Schönbach (born 1965), retired Vice Admiral of the German Navy and politician (Values Union)
- Wolfgang Schellmann (1911–1944), military aviator from the Luftwaffe

=== Royalty and socialites ===
- Jérôme Bonaparte (1784–1860), Prince, brother of Napoleon Bonaparte, lived in Kassel while he was king of Westphalia
- Maria Amalia of Courland (1653–1711), noblewoman, participated in creation of park at Karlsaue
- Prince Charles of Hesse-Kassel (1744–1836)
- Prince Frederick of Hesse-Kassel (1747–1837)
- Princess and Landgravine Augusta of Hesse-Kassel (1797–1889), consort to Prince Adolphus, Duke of Cambridge
- Landgravine Charlotte of Hesse-Kassel (1627–1686), noblewoman, member of the House of Hesse-Kassel
- Louise of Hesse-Kassel (1817–1898), princess of Hesse-Kassel, later queen consort of King Christian IX of Denmark
- William IV, Landgrave of Hesse-Kassel (1532–1592), the first Landgrave of the Landgraviate of Hesse-Kassel
- Frederick I of Sweden (1676–1751), King of Sweden and also Landgrave of Hesse-Kassel

=== Scientists and physicians ===
- Valerius Cordus (1515–1544) physician and botanist, authored pharmacopoeias and herbals
- Friedrich Armand Strubberg (1806–1889), merchant, physician, colonist in North America, direct descendant of Frederick I of Sweden
- Justus Carl Hasskarl (1809–1894), botanist specialising in Pteridophytes, Bryophytes, and Spermatophytes
- Carl Friedrich Claus (1827–1900), chemist
- Adolf Eugen Fick (1829–1901), physiologist
- Ludwig Karl Georg Pfeiffer (1805–1877), physician, botanist and conchologist
- Jakob Stilling (1842–1915), ophthalmologist, son of Benedict Stilling, surgeon, and brother of Heinrich Stilling, pathologist
- Carl Kaiserling (1869–1942), pathologist

=== Sports ===
- Leni Junker (1905–1997), sprinter
- Yunus Mallı (born 1992), Turkish footballer
- Annika Mehlhorn (born 1983), butterfly and medley swimmer
- Yona Melnik (born 1949), Israeli Olympic judoka
- Carolin Simon (born 1992), footballer

=== Writers and journalists ===
- The Brothers Grimm, Jacob (1785–1863) and Wilhelm Grimm (1786–1859), academics, linguists, cultural researchers, and authors who collected folklore and published several collections as Grimms' Fairy Tales
- Helmut Kollars (born 1968), writer and illustrator
- Rudolf Erich Raspe (1736–1794), University of Kassel librarian who fled to England after embezzling significant funds from Frederick II, Landgrave of Hesse-Kassel, and wrote (or compiled) The Surprising Adventures of Baron Munchhausen
- Christian Ludwig Reissig (1784–1847), romantic poet
- Paul Reuter (1816–1899), reporter, founder of the Reuters news agency
- Lucien Scheler (1902–1999), French poet, writer, and publisher
- Günter Bannas (1952-2026), German journalist
- Anant Kumar (born 1969), writer, journalist, translator and literary critic of Indian descent

=== Others ===
- Barbara Goette (1908-1997), multiple courses and multiple jobs.
- Herman Lamm (1890–1930), German-American bank robber
- Carl Loessel (1812–1879), German-born Lutheran pastor in Australia
- Norbert Trelle (born 1942), Roman Catholic German bishop
- Nils Seethaler (born 1981), ethnologist
- Adele Storck (1874-1960), German-born American lawyer

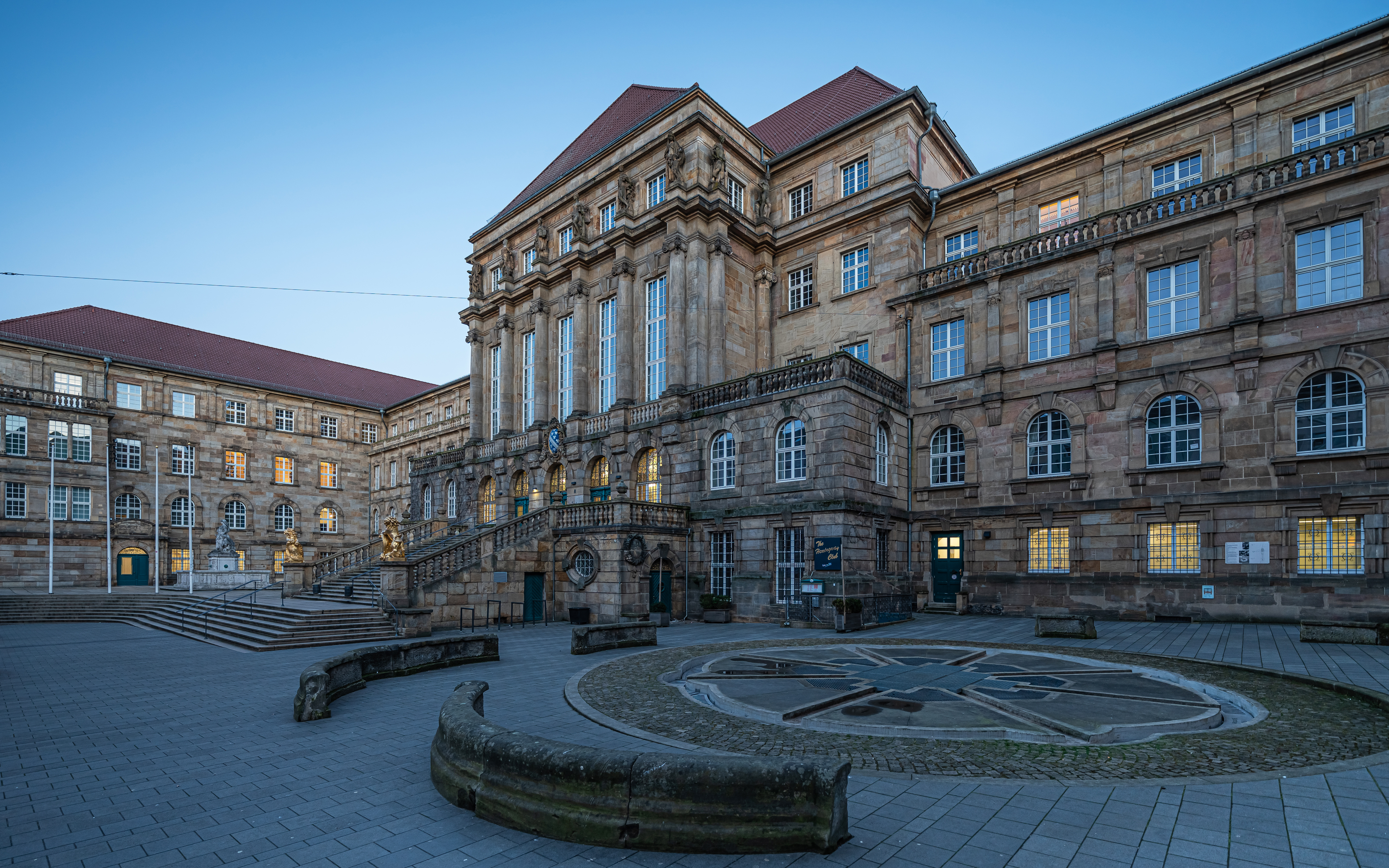
The city hall

== Twin towns – sister cities ==
Kassel is twinned with:

- Florence, Italy (1952)
- Mitte (Berlin), Germany (1962)
- Mulhouse, France (1965)
- Rovaniemi, Finland (1972)
- Västerås, Sweden (1972)
- Yaroslavl, Russia (1988)
- Arnstadt, Germany (1989)
- Ramat Gan, Israel (1990)
- Kocaeli, Turkey (1999)

== See also ==
- Air-raid shelter am Weinberg
