= Karlsaue =

Coordinates: 51°18′07″N 9°29′36″E

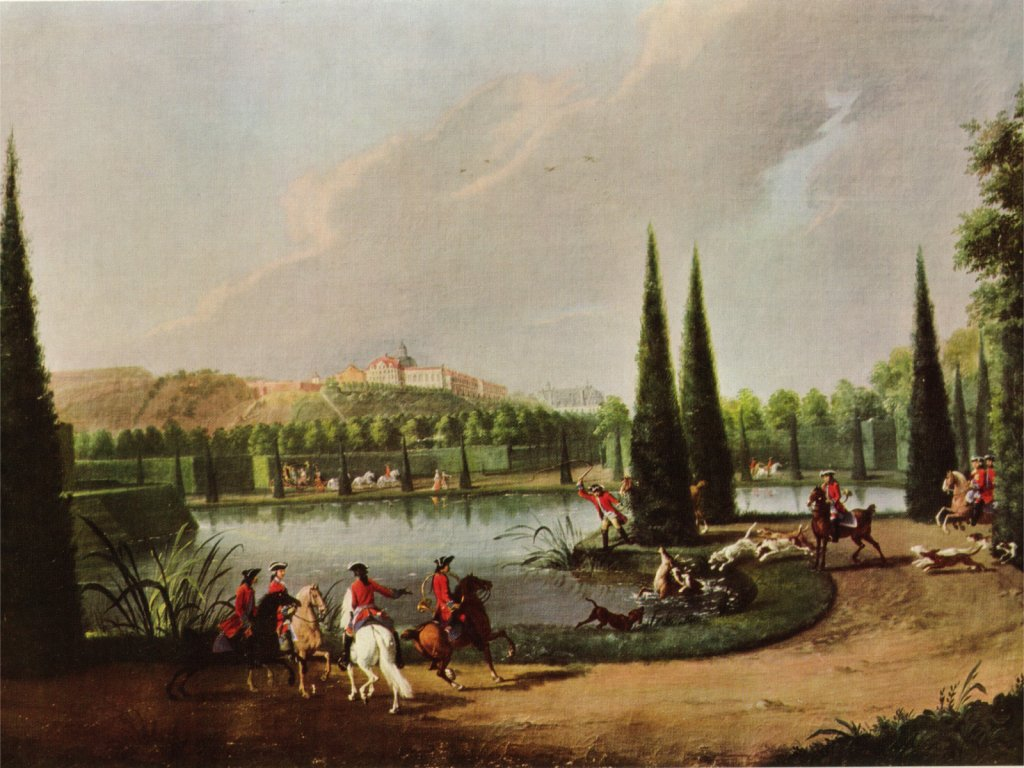
"Hunting in the Karlsaue" by Johann Heinrich Tischbein

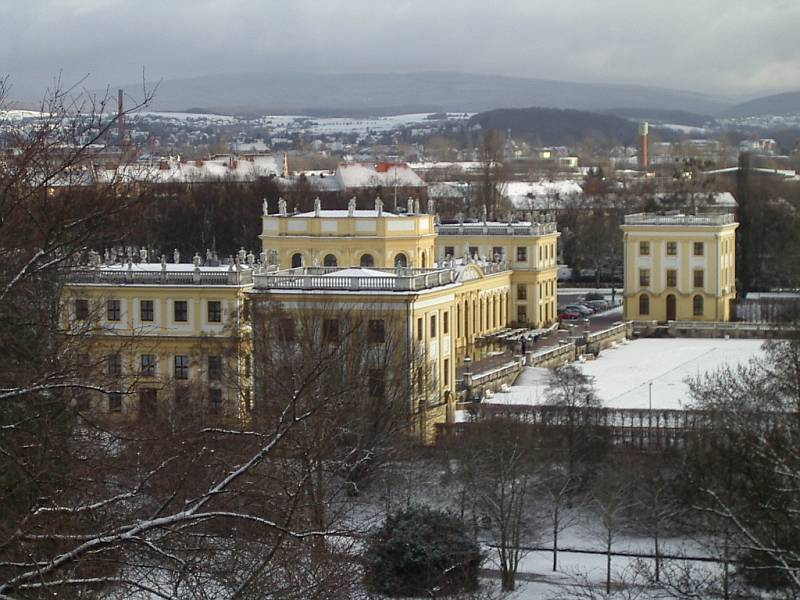
The Orangerie

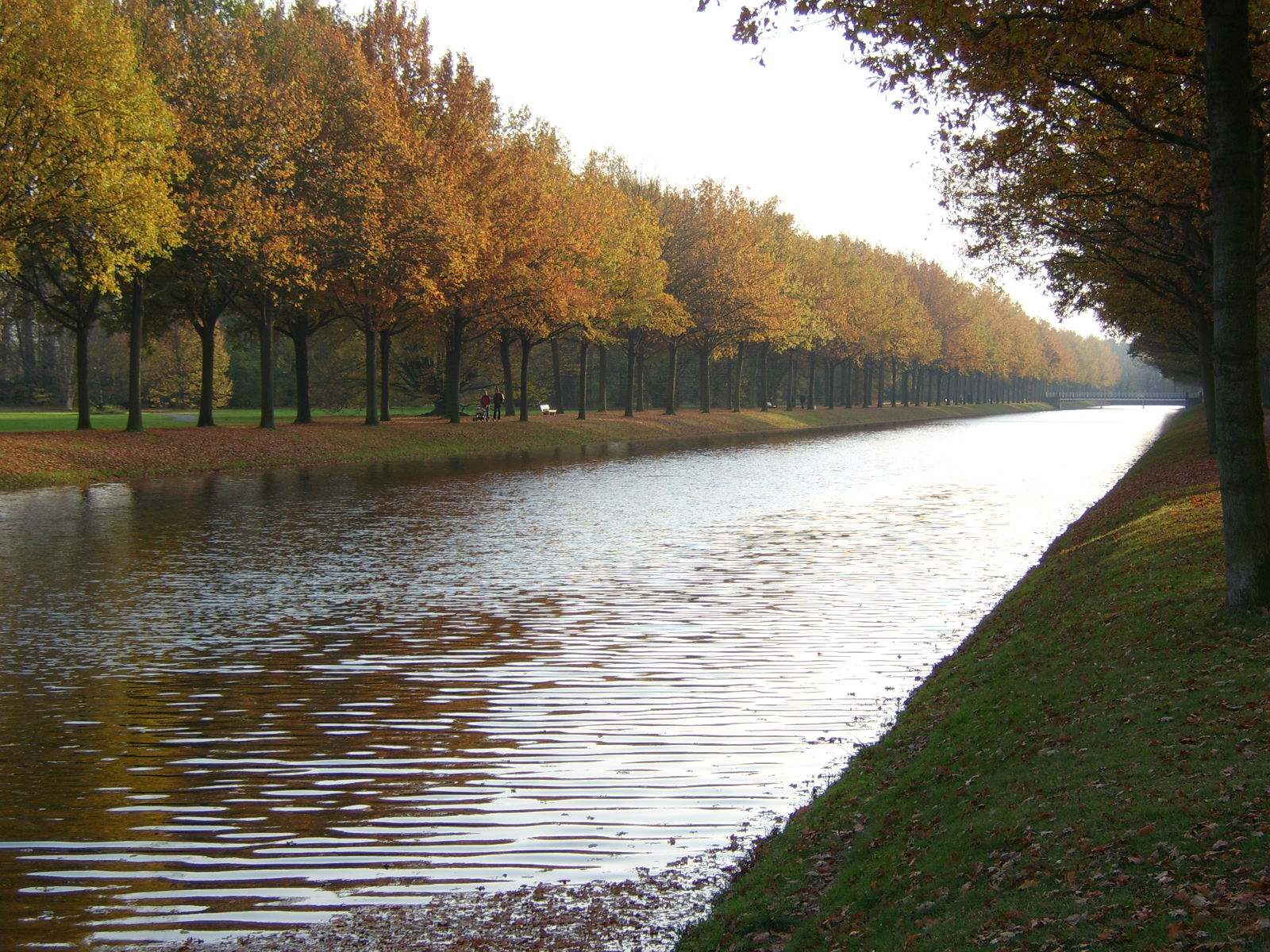
A canal in the park

The Karlsaue (German pronunciation: [ˈkaʁlsˌʔaʊə]) Park is a public and inner-city park of 1.50 km^{2} (0.58 sq mi) in Kassel (Northern Hesse, Germany). It was redesigned as a landscape garden in 1785 and consists of a mixture of visible Baroque garden elements and arranged “natural areas”.

== Location ==
The Karlsaue is located on the western bank of the river Fulda southeast of the city centre of Kassel, near the central Friedrichsplatz. In the southwest the Karlsaue borders to sport facilities like the Auestadion and the ice skating rink.

== History ==
The impressive historical park was created on an almost entirely flat terrain; it contains many man-made lakes, canals and fountains. The main palace Orangerie was built by Landgrave Charles between 1654 and 1730 as an “exotic winter garden” until the beginning of the Second World War. It serves as an astronomy and physical cabinet today and the marble bath. In 1955 and in 1981 the Federal horticultural show took place in the park. A botanical highlight is the “Siebenbergen” island, which was redesigned by court gardener Hentze in 1822. Since 2009, it is part of the European Garden Heritage Network.
