= Orangerie (Kassel) =

Orangery in Kassel, Germany

Coordinates: 51°18′37″N 9°30′3″E

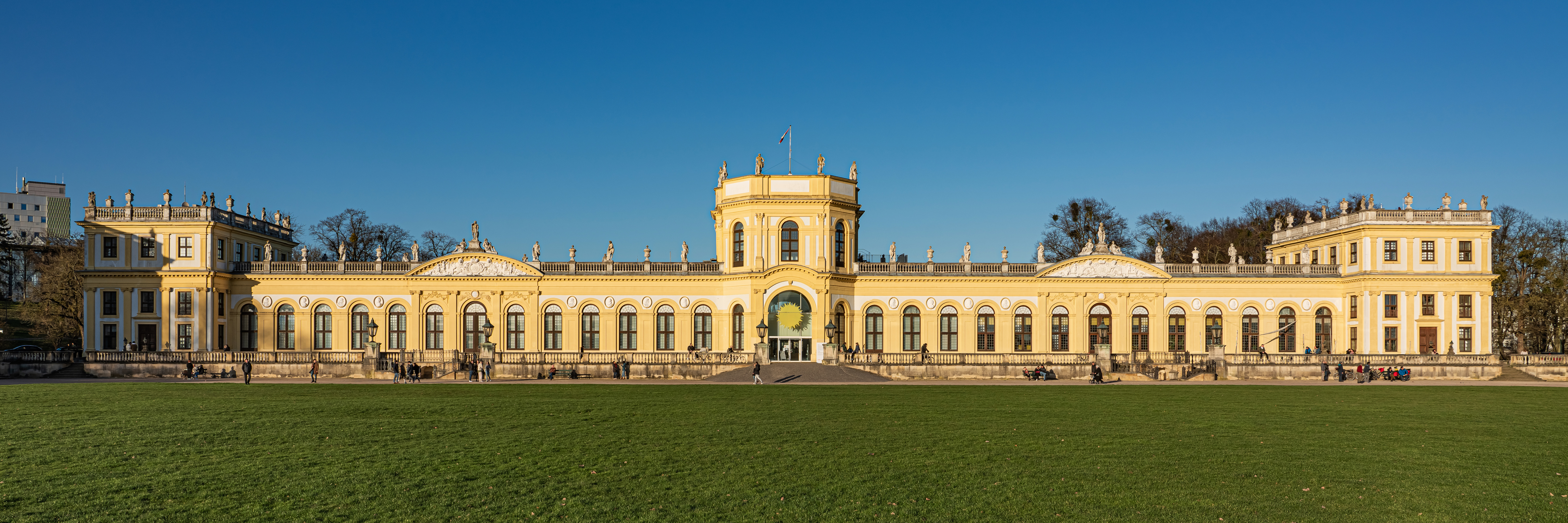
Orangerie Kassel

The Orangerie is an orangery in Kassel, Hesse, Germany. It was built under Landgrave Charles between 1703 and 1711. Since then, it forms the northern corner of the Karlsaue park. Today it is used as an astronomy and physical cabinet.

== History ==
The ground of the Orangerie was an old garden, in which Landgrave William IV built a small summer house. His successor, Landgrave Moritz redesigned the garden in the 17th century. The baroque castle of today was designed and built by the architect Johann Conrad Giesler in 1702, who worked on the court of the landgrave. The main building is 139.40 meters long. The marble bath (Marmorbad) was designed by Pierre-Étienne Monnot and is shown as a separate museum today.

In World War II, the Orangerie was damaged and later repaired to host the federal garden show 1955. After the show the building was restored and transformed into the astronomy and physical cabinet with planetarium; in 1996 an astronomical garden was added.

During the documenta 12, the space in front of the Orangerie was used for the exhibition, which included a temporary 9,500 square meter hall named Auepavillon.
