= Hercules monument (Kassel) =

German national heritage site

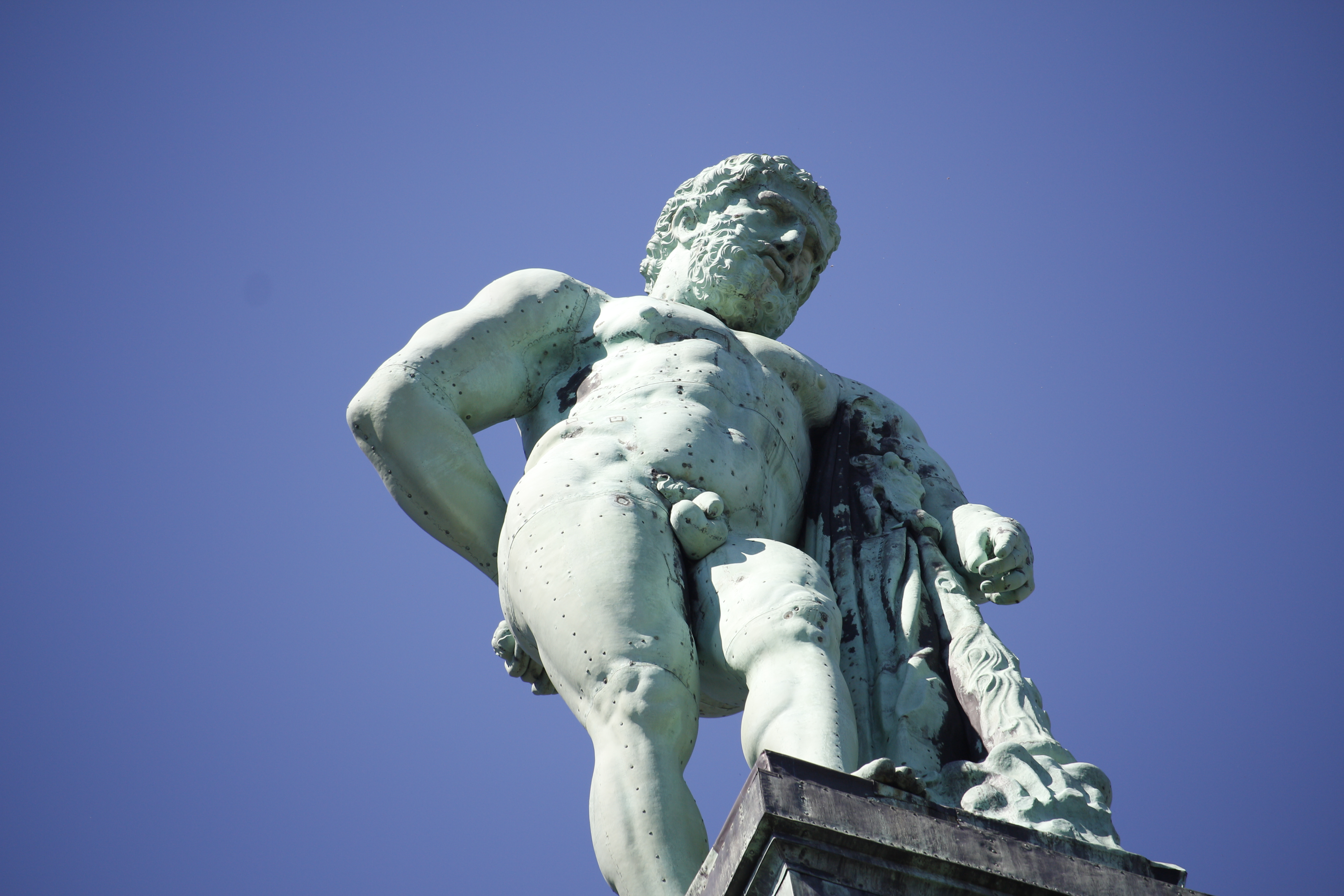
- Interactive map of Hercules monument (Kassel)
- Location: Bergpark Wilhelmshöhe, Hesse, Germany
- Coordinates: 51.316°N 9.393°E
- Opening date: 1717

The Hercules monument is a landmark in the German city of Kassel. It is located in the Bergpark Wilhelmshöhe (Wilhelmshöhe Mountainpark) in northern Hesse, Germany.

Hercules is a copper statue depicting the ancient Greek demigod Heracles (Gr. Ηρακλής, German Herkules). The statue is located at the top of a pyramid, which stands on top of the octagon; the statue and the other parts of the monument were constructed at different times. Today "Hercules" refers to the whole monument, including the Octagon and Pyramid. The monument is the highest point in the Wilhelmshöhe Bergpark.

The monument is located in Bad Wilhelmshöhe, on the Eastern ridge of the Habichtswald. It was built in an artificial dell of the Karlsberg (526 m (1,726 ft) above sea level) on the western-most and highest location (515 m (1,690 ft)) of the line of sight Schloss Wilhelmshöhe – Hercules.

The Hercules monument and the surrounding Wilhelmshöhe Bergpark were inscribed as a World Heritage Site in 2013, owing to their outstanding Baroque architecture and intricate water features.

== Design ==
=== Water features ===
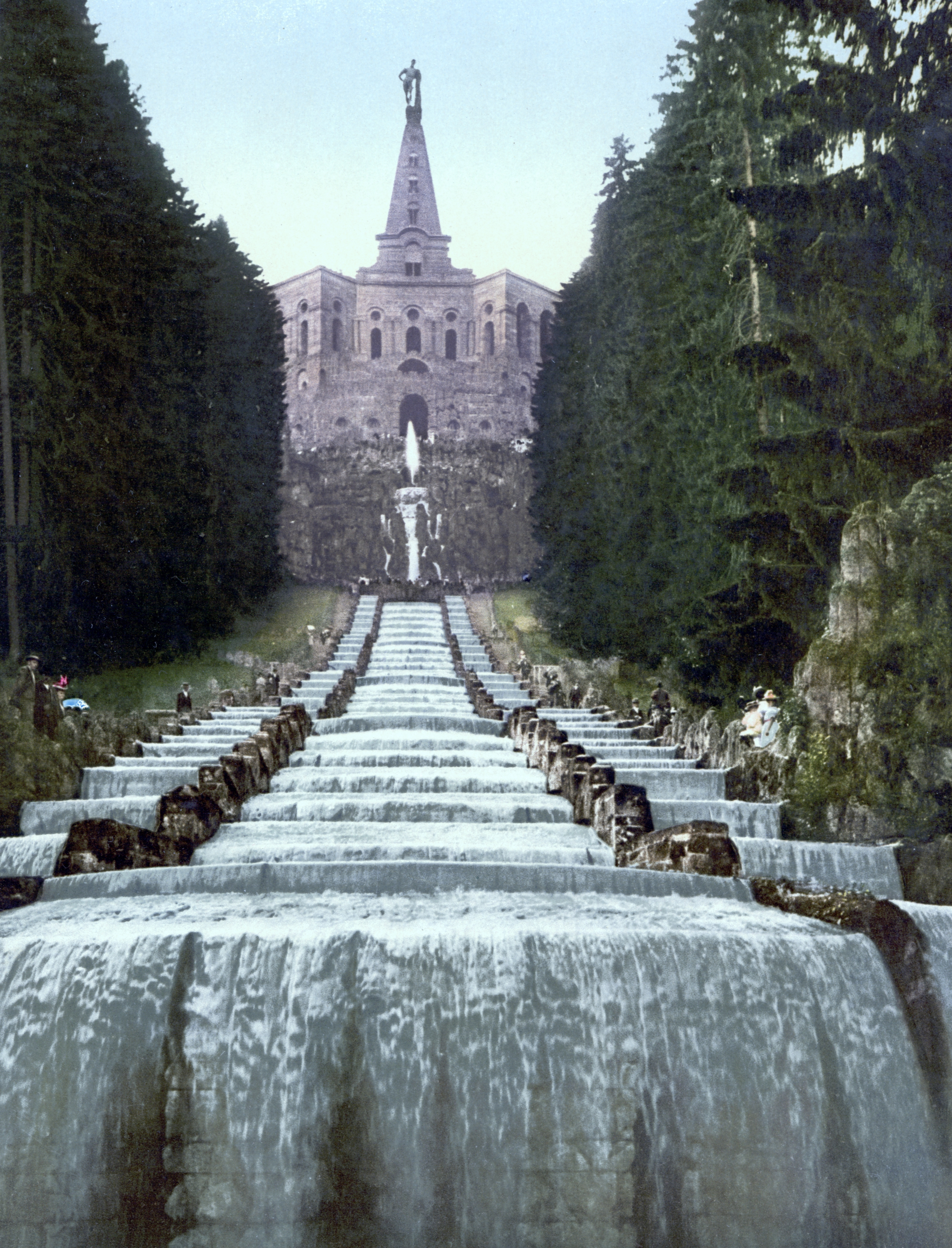
Water running down the cascades, a coloured picture before 1903

The water features were built on 3 June 1714 (312 years ago). The cascades are a 250-meter (820 ft) long stone structure shaped like a staircase. The water starts from the Hercules monument and runs down the cascades, Steinhöfer's waterfall, the devil's bridge, finally tumbling down the aqueduct before finally arriving at the lake where a fountain of about 50 meters (160 ft) ends the spectacle. About 350,000 liters (77,000 imp gal; 92,000 U.S. gal) of water are needed.

This system relies on natural pressure from reservoirs and underground pipes whose locks are opened manually

During the summer (from May until October every Wednesday and Sunday afternoon), visitors can attend this event. Additionally, every first Saturday of the months of June, July, August and September this event takes place during the evening with lights of different colors illuminating the water, the fountain and the monument features.

=== Octagon and statue ===
The Hercules monument has a total height of 70.5 meters (231 ft): 32.65 meters (107.1 ft) for the Octagon; 29.60 meters (97.1 ft) for the Pyramid and 8.25 meters (27.1 ft) for the statue. The height difference between top of the statue and the bottom of the cascades is 179 meters (587 ft).

== History ==
Construction of the Bergpark began in 1696. The Hercules statue was built from 1701 to 1717 and is based on the design of the Italian Giovanni Francesco Guerniero. The complex is the northernmost part of the park and is an important baroque aspect of the Bergpark Wilhelmshöhe. 520 steps lead to the top.

In late 2005, a restructuring of the entire monument, including the statue was initiated. Initially, the project was to be completed in 2009. The restoration was later estimated to cost more than 24 million Euro and last through 2018.

=== Material ===
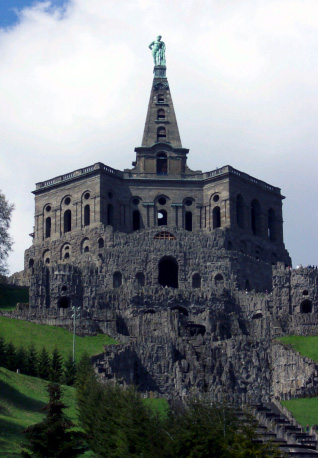
The Hercules – the Kassel landmark

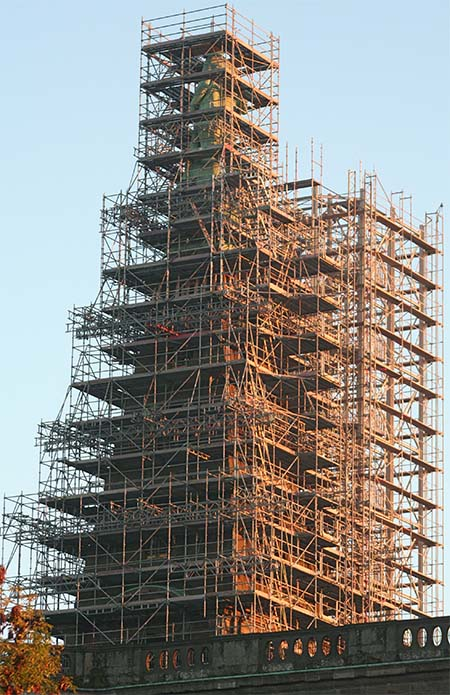
Restructuring at the Hercules monument in autumn 2006

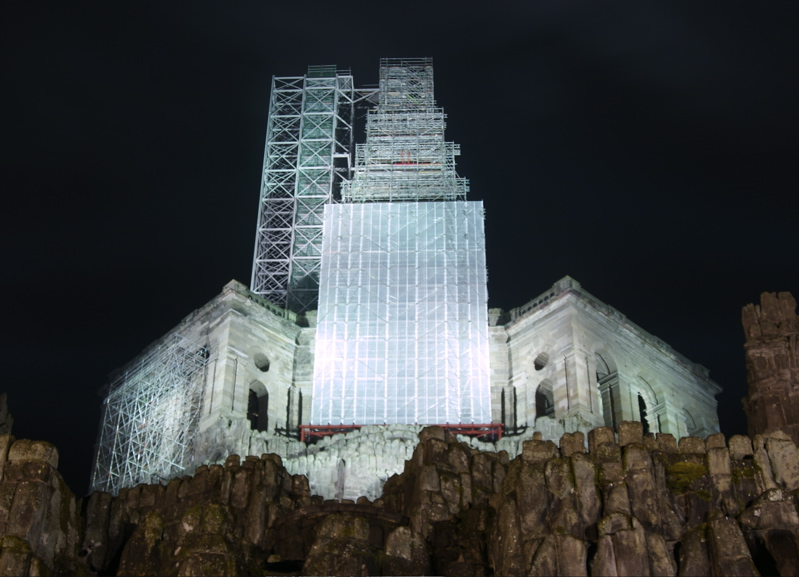
January 2007 – Hercules still cloaked

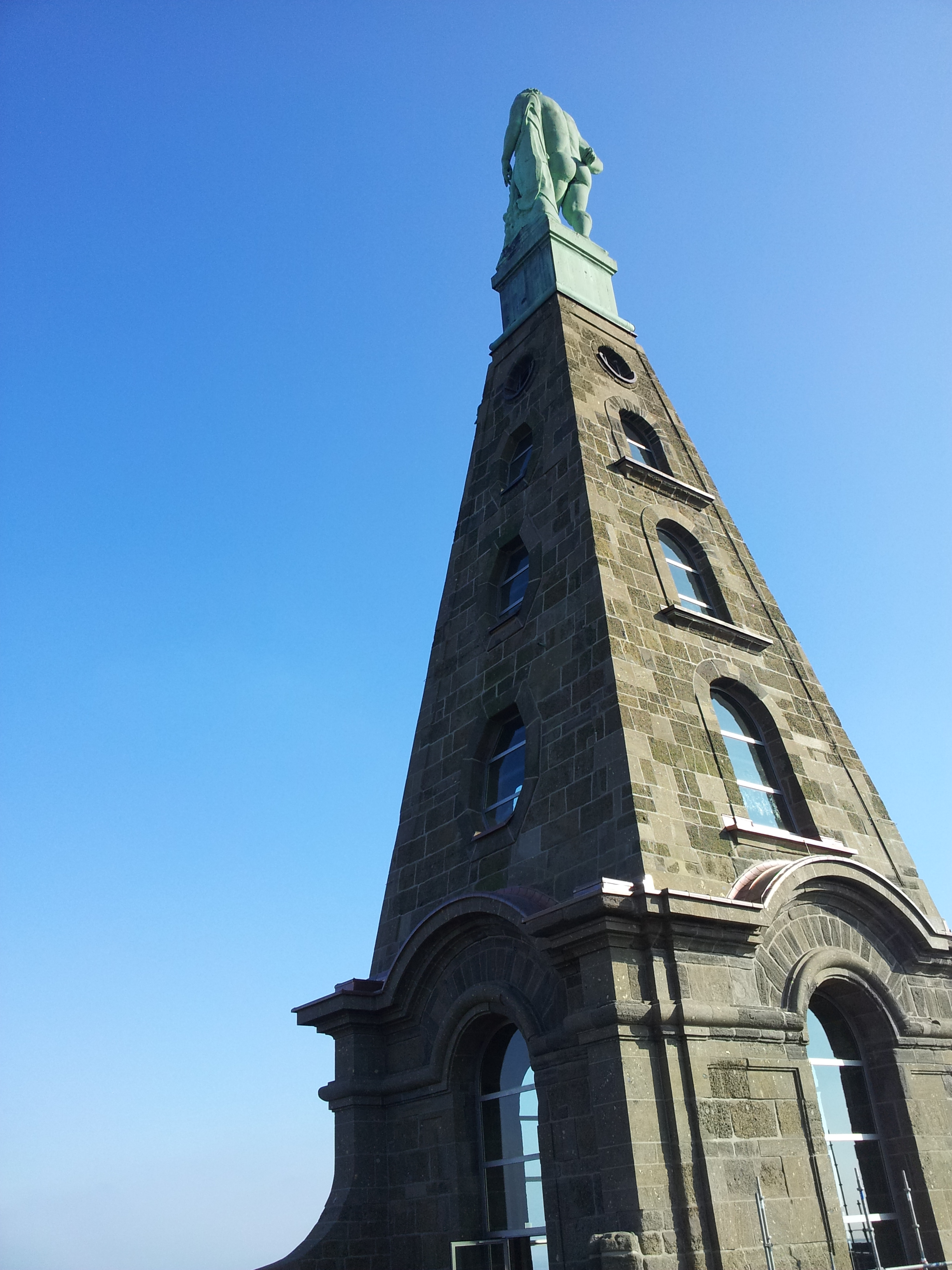
Back view of the statue in September 2011

The complete structure (Octagon and Cascades) are made of Tuff sourced from quarries nearby. This soft material has the advantage of good workability, but weathers quickly, particularly by frost-related erosion. This rapid weathering process has been a structural issue for the statue.
