= 1710 in architecture =

The year 1710 in architecture involved some significant architectural events and new buildings.

== Buildings and structures ==
=== Buildings completed ===
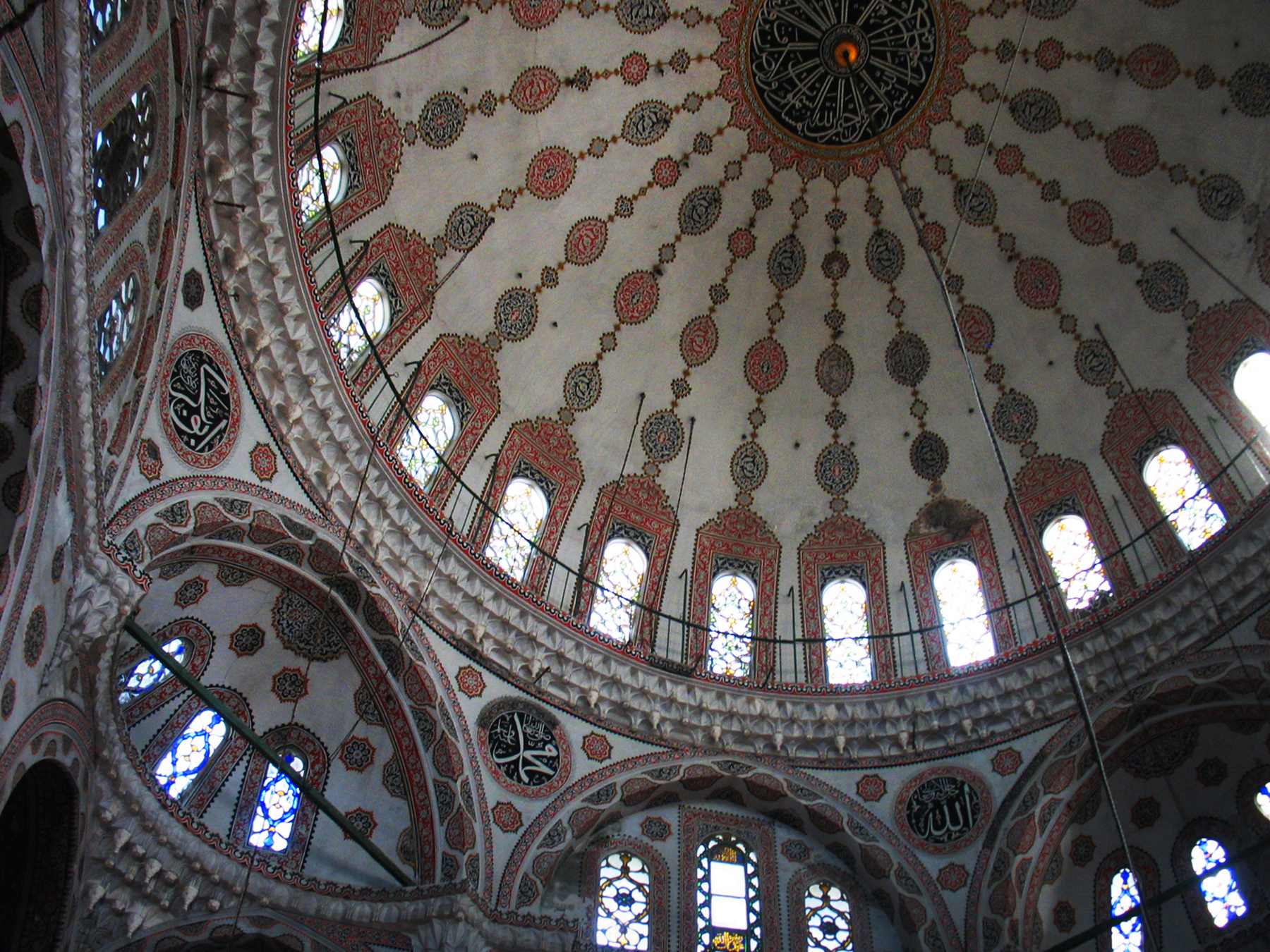
Yeni Valide Mosque

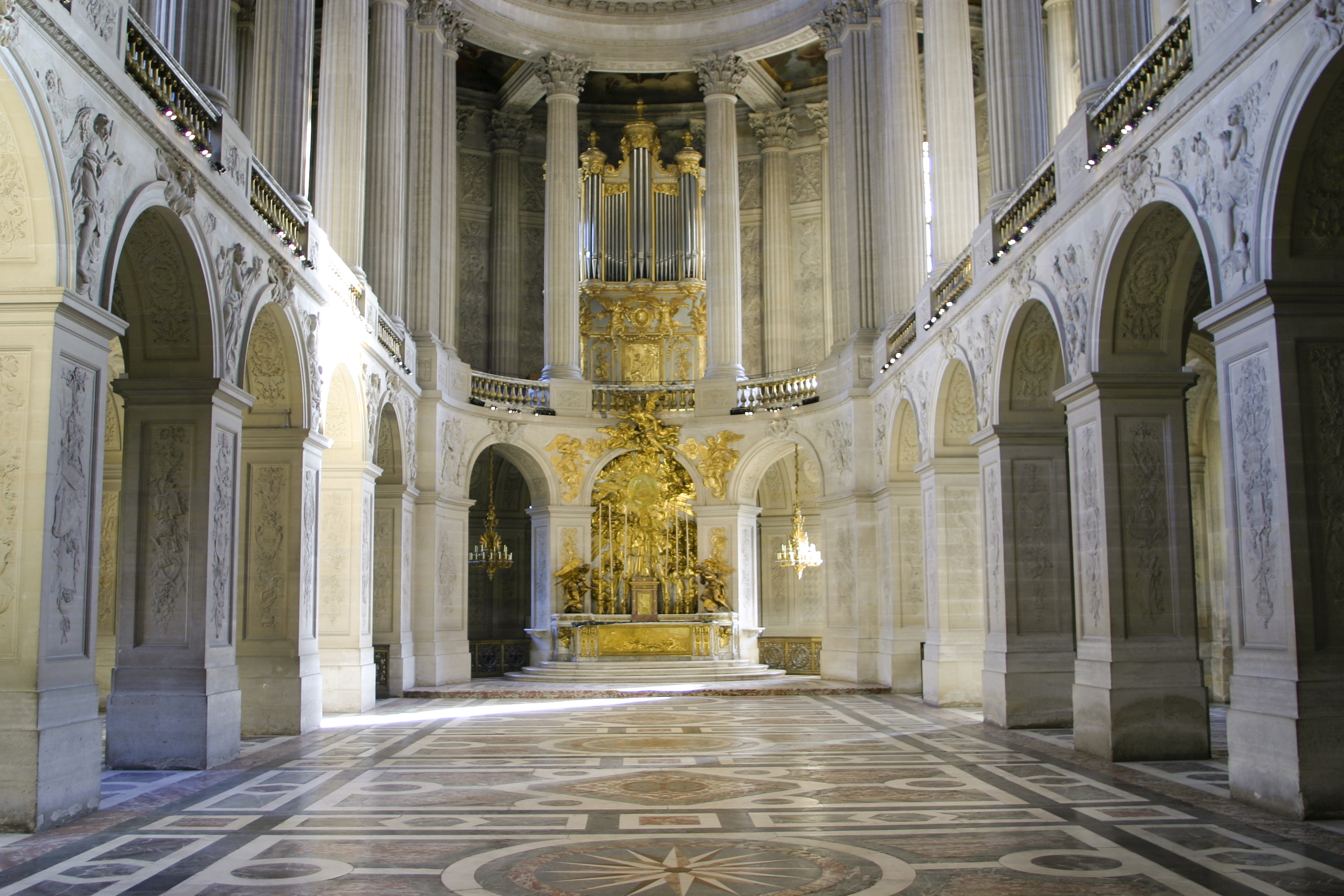
Chapel of Versailles

- Cathedral of Saint Virgin Mary, Minsk, Belarus.
- Fifth Chapel of Versailles by Robert de Cotte.
- Granada Cathedral
- Yeni Valide Mosque, Istanbul, Turkey
- Karlskirche (Kassel), designed by Paul du Ry.
- Paoay Church on Luzon in the Philippines
- Gravisi–Barbabianca Palace, Capodistria, rebuilt.
- Mansion House, Dublin, Ireland, official residence of the Lord Mayor of Dublin since 1715
- Ca' Pesaro on the Grand Canal, Venice, completed by Gian Antonio Gaspari to the 1659 design of Baldassarre Longhena.

== Births ==
- July 1 – Esprit-Joseph Brun, French architect (died 1802)
- Approximate date – Antonio Rinaldi, Italian-born architect (died 1794)

== Deaths ==
- January 1 – William Bruce, Scottish architect (born c.1630)
- December 10 – Robert Mylne, Scottish stonemason and architect (born 1633)
- December 14 – Henry Aldrich, English polymath and amateur architect (born 1647)
