= 1794 in architecture =

The year 1794 in architecture involved some significant architectural events and new buildings.

== Events ==
- date unknown – French confectioner Louis Jules Benois, forefather of the Benois family of artists, musicians, and architects, arrives in Russia following the French Revolution.
- Construction of houses on the edge of Blackheath, London, designed by Michael Searles, begins: The Paragon (a crescent), South Row and Montpelier Row; they will be completed in 1805.
- The interior of St. Nicholas Church, Leipzig in Saxony is remodeled by Johann Carl Friedrich Dauthe in the neoclassical style.

== Buildings and structures ==
=== Buildings ===
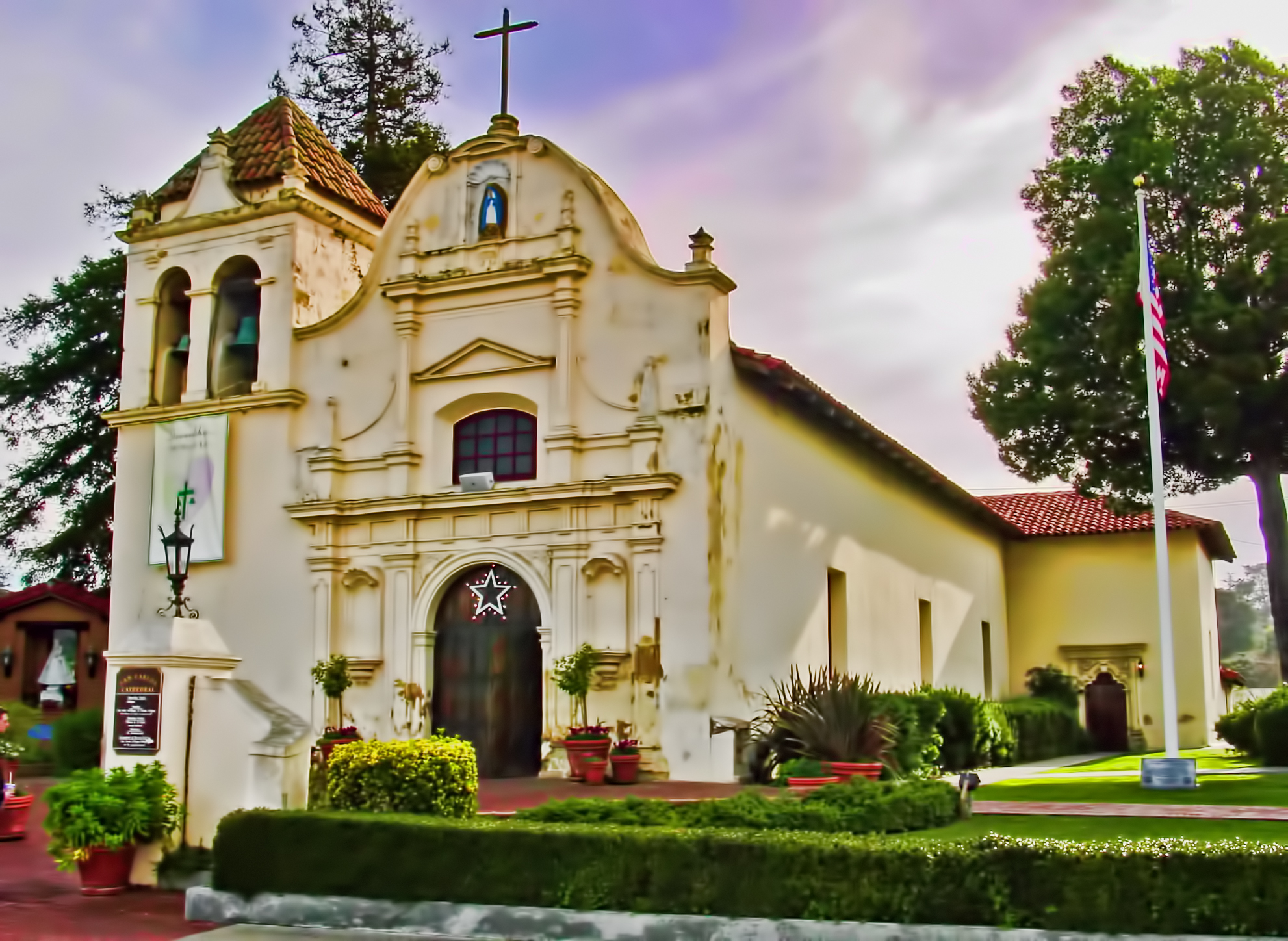
San Carlos Borromeo

- Needle of Rijswijk, monument at Forest of Rijswijk, Netherlands.
- Fru Haugans Hotel, Mosjøen, Norway.
- The second Royal Presidio Chapel at the Presidio of Monterey in Spanish Alta California. The chapel, now known as the Cathedral of San Carlos Borromeo, is the first stone building in the province.
- The Cathedral Basilica of St. Louis in New Orleans, Louisiana, USA.
- The Radcliffe Observatory building at Oxford, England.
- Mumbles Lighthouse, Swansea, Wales.

== Births ==
- August 30 – John Rennie the Younger, English civil engineer (died 1874)
- October 26 – Konstantin Thon, Russian imperial architect during the reign of Tsar Nicholas I (died 1881)

== Deaths ==
- February 23 – James Playfair, Scottish Neoclassical architect (born 1755; consumption)
- February 27 – Jean-Rodolphe Perronet, French architect and structural engineer (born 1708)
- April 10 – Antonio Rinaldi, Italian architect working in Russia (born 1710)
- July 8 – Richard Mique, French Neoclassical architect (born 1728)
- October 20 – James Adam, Scottish architect and furniture designer, brother of Robert Adam (born 1732)
