= Bellevue Palace, Kassel =

Bellevue Palace
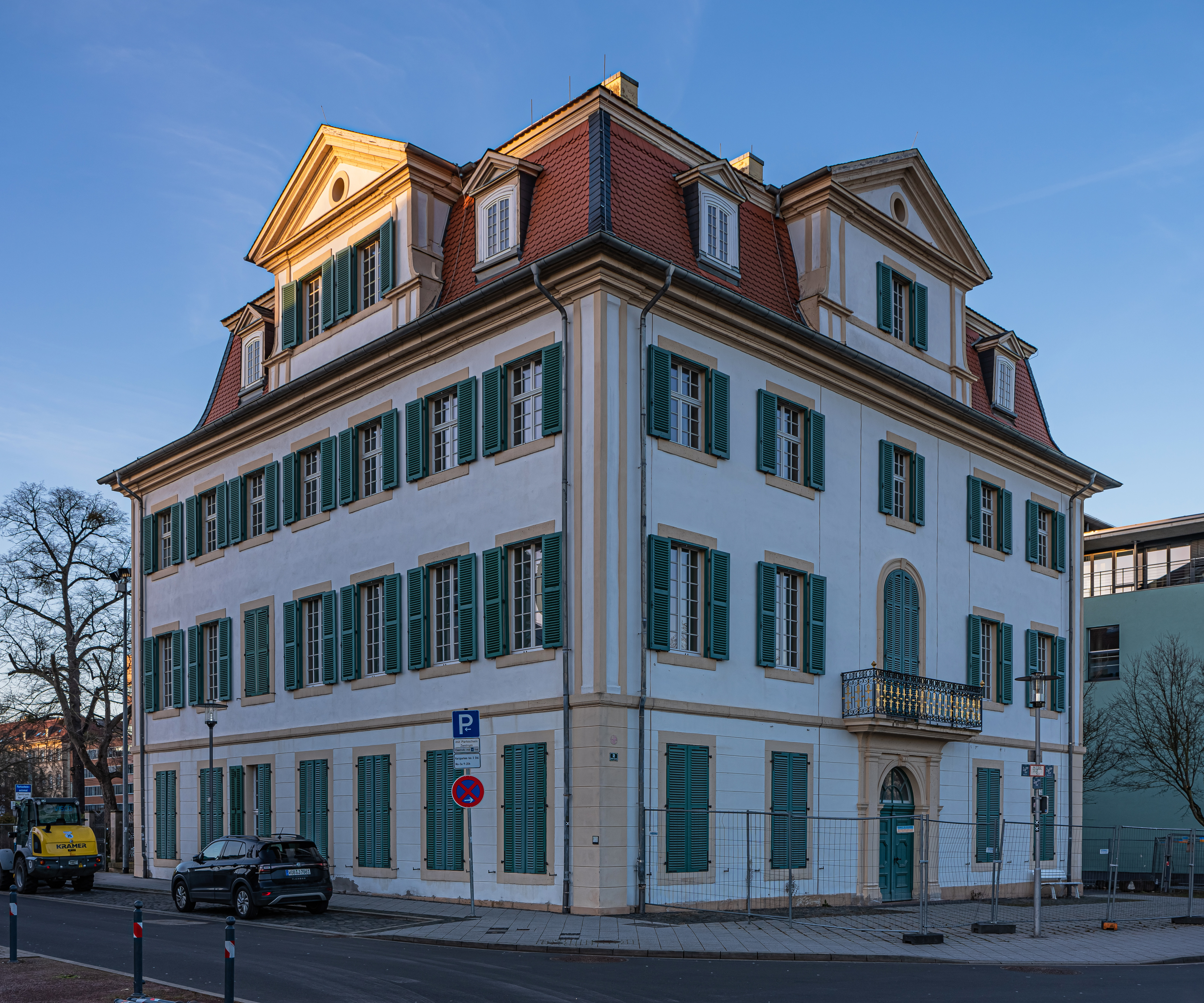

- Location within Hesse Location within Germany
- Alternative names: Palais Bellevue, Schloss Bellevue

General information
- Status: Museum
- Location: Kassel, Germany
- Coordinates: 51.309839°N 9.493933°E
- Opened: 1714

Design and construction
- Architect: Paul du Ry

Bellevue Palace (German: Palais Bellevue or Schloss Bellevue) in Kassel was built in 1714 for Charles I, Landgrave of Hesse-Kassel. Originally the building served as an Observatory. It became a residence, and then part of Bellevue Castle, which was later destroyed. Until its closure for structural reasons in 2009, the building housed a museum devoted to the Grimm Brothers, which has now moved to the Grimmwelt Kassel.

== Location ==
Bellevue Palace is near the center of Kassel, west of the Fulde River. It is next to the Neue Galerie, an art museum founded in 1976 in an 1874 neo-classical building. Bellevue Palace was erected in 1714 by the French architect and Huguenot refugee Paul du Ry as an observatory for Charles I (1654–1730), Landgrave of Hesse-Kassel.

== History ==
From about 1725 on, the palace was used as a residence for members of the Landgrave's court, such as his mistress Barbara Christine von Bernhold (1690–1756). Prince Frederick II (1720–1785), Landgrave from 1760 on, married Mary, daughter of King George II of Great Britain. He had the palace surrounded by an Anglo-Chinese garden, the first such garden on the continent. In 1779, Frederick II opened a public museum of natural history and classical art, the Fridericianum, but kept the royal painting collection in Bellevue palace. In 1790 Simon Louis du Ry renovated the building for William IX (1743–1821).

During the Napoleonic era the palace became the property of Jérôme Bonaparte (1784–1860), King of Westphalia from 1807 to 1813. It first housed his foreign minister, Pierre-Alexandre Le Camus. In 1810, Auguste-Henri-Victor Grandjean de Montigny rebuilt the state rooms of the palace, and after Kassel's primary palace had burned in 1811, Jérôme himself moved into Bellevue Palace. Jacob Grimm, the private librarian of King Jérôme and state auditor, was a frequent visitor. After Jérôme was expelled in 1813 William IX, later Elector William I of Hesse (1743–1821), returned. William II (1777–1847) also lived here. The Electress Augusta (1780–1841), who was estranged from William II, used it as her town house and summer residence.

In 1866 Hesse was annexed to Prussia. The building was recovered by a branch of the princely family in 1880. From 1933 until the Second World War it was the residence of Philipp, Landgrave of Hesse (1896–1980), during his tenure as President of the Province of Hesse-Nassau. In the mid-1930s Philipp made parts of the palace into a public art gallery. When Philipp was arrested in September 1943 on suspicion of plotting with the Italian royal family to overthrow Mussolini, the palace was plastered with posters denouncing the Italian royalty. The palace survived Allied bombing raids during World War II (1939-1945) with little damage.

The palace was acquired by the city of Kassel in 1956, and until 1970 it was the home of the Municipal Art Collection. The Louis Spohr museum, closed by the Nazis in 1933, was re-opened in the building in 1967. It included four display rooms and an archive. The displays presented the violinist Louis Spohr and other violinists and violins of the period. In 1972 the Brothers Grimm exhibition was moved to the ground floor of the palace. In 1999 the Brothers Grimm Museum took over the entire building.

The Brothers Grimm exhibition has since moved to a nearby museum, the palace is now closed.

== Structure ==
The Bellevue Palace is the only palace from the early 18th century in Kassel, since the others were destroyed during World War II or in an "anti-feudal" demolition wave in the 1950s. The building has simple but elegant facades, broken only by a slight cornice above the ground floor. It is three stories high and almost square, with two side wings on the rear garden. The street front has a balcony above a classical portal. The building originally had a cross-shaped roof structure with an octagonal dome for the observatory. Later this was replaced by a high mansard roof with gabled extensions. The interior has rooms decorated in a simple combination of rococo style and classicism. The classical stairway is well preserved. The large central room on the ground floor has a beautiful pilaster. Since 1994 the building has been extensively repaired and restored, with an escalator installed.

== Gallery ==
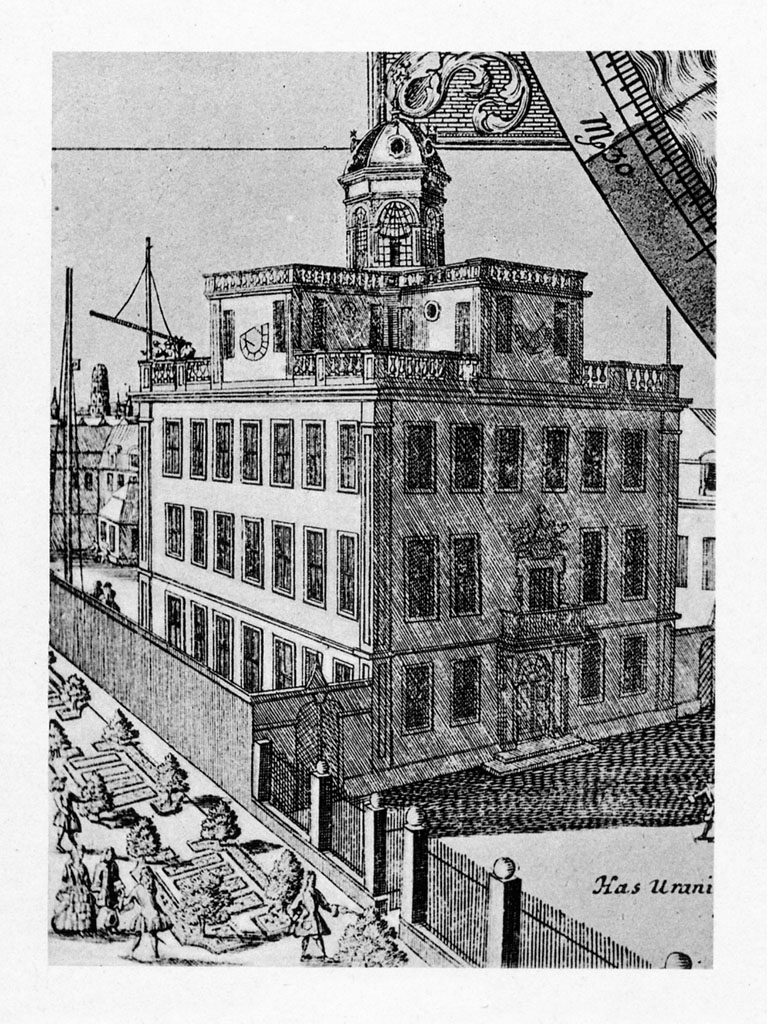
The building in 1742, used as an observatory by Johann Gabriel Doppelmayr

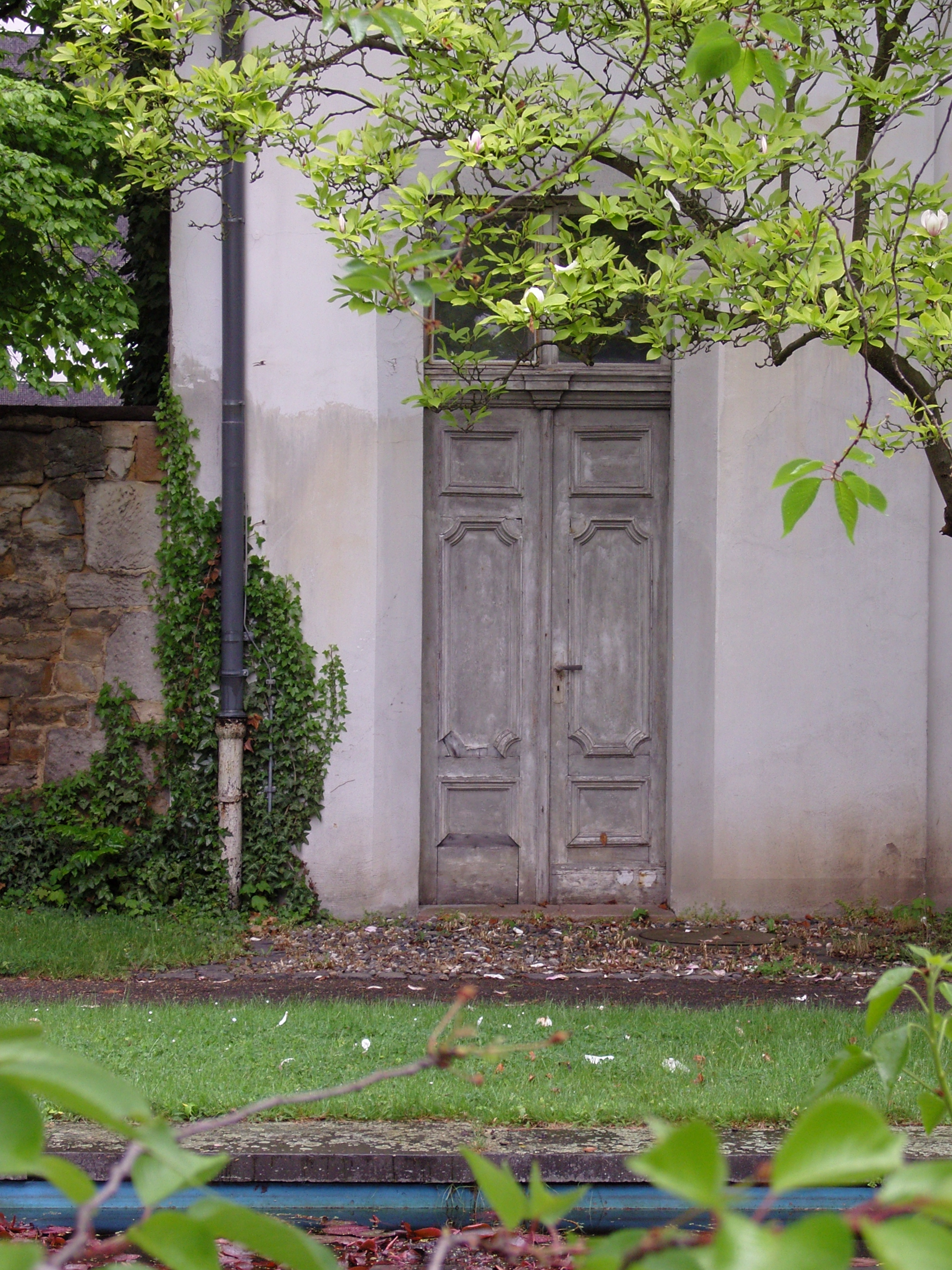
Baroque door in the courtyard of the palace

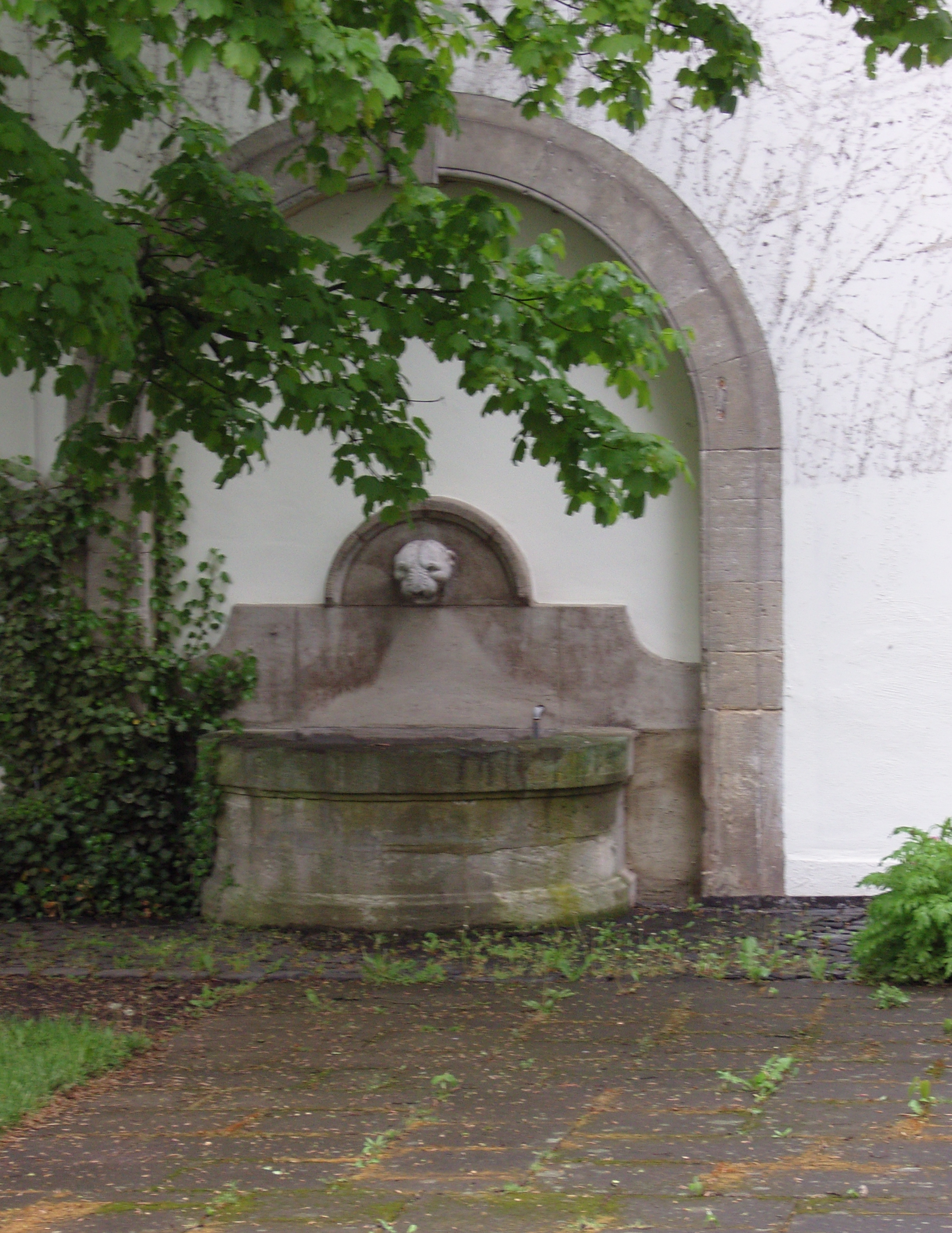
Fountain in the courtyard

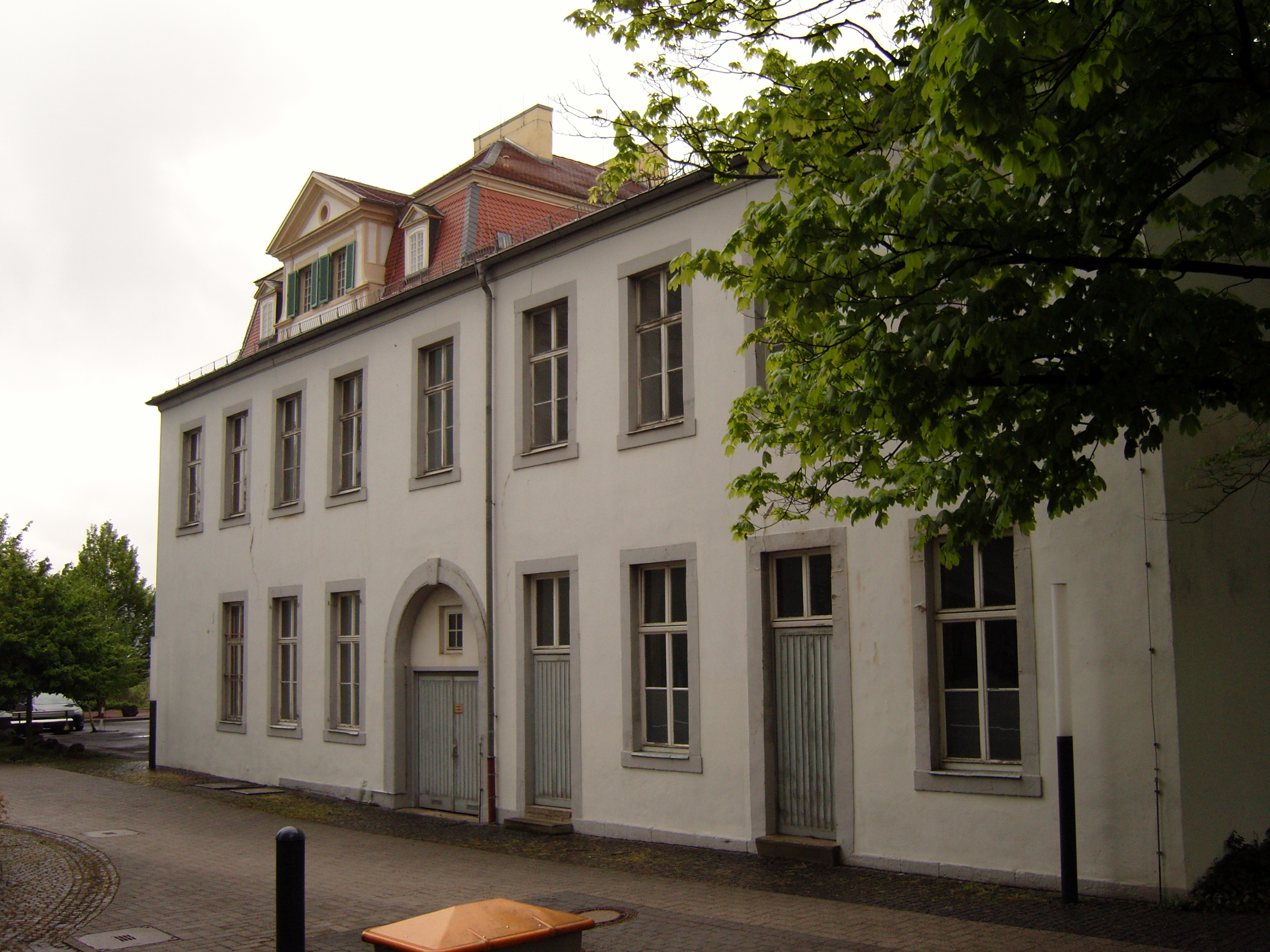
Old annex to the palace
