= 1802 in architecture =

The year 1802 in architecture involved some significant events.

== Buildings and structures ==
=== Buildings ===
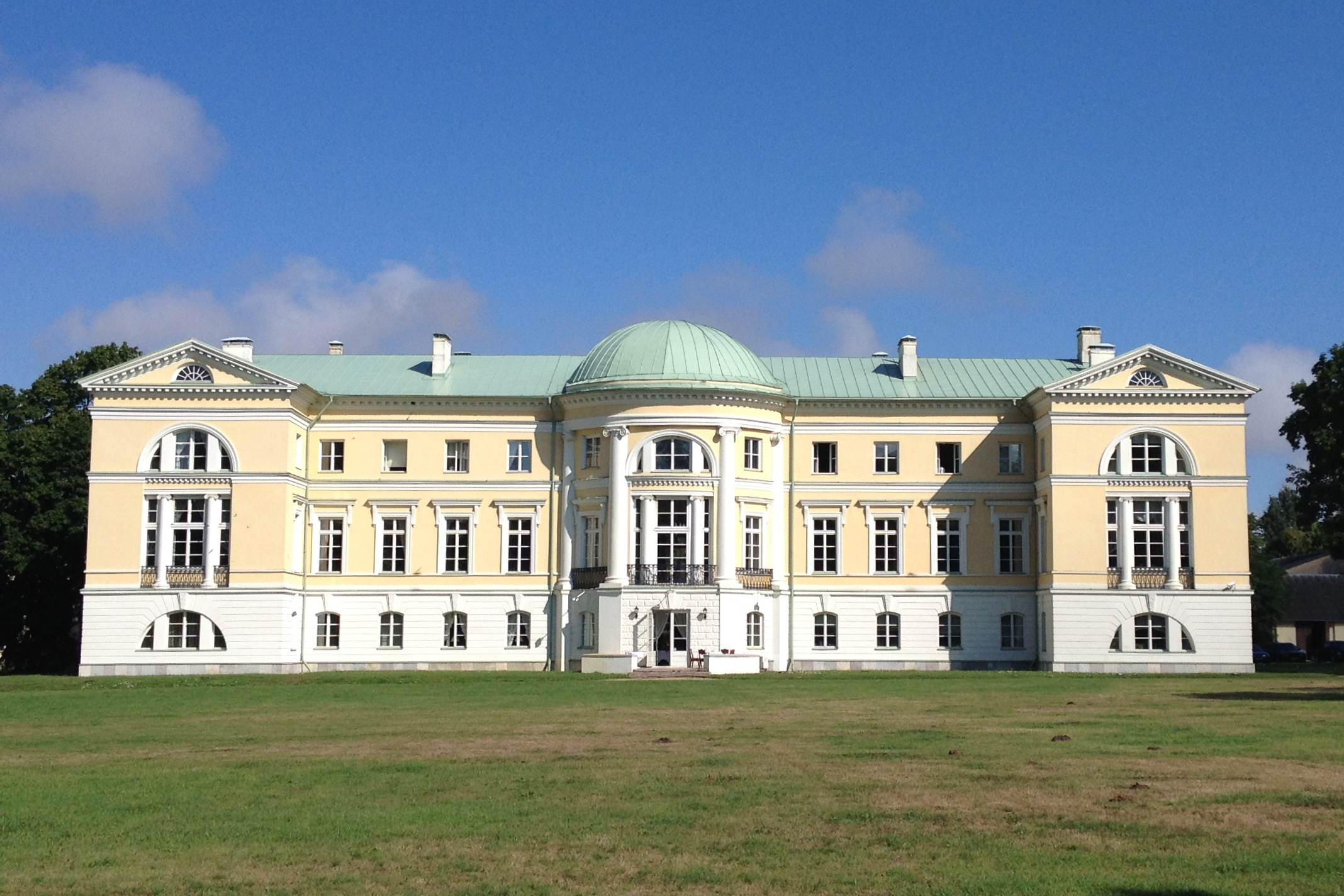
Mežotne Palace in Latvia

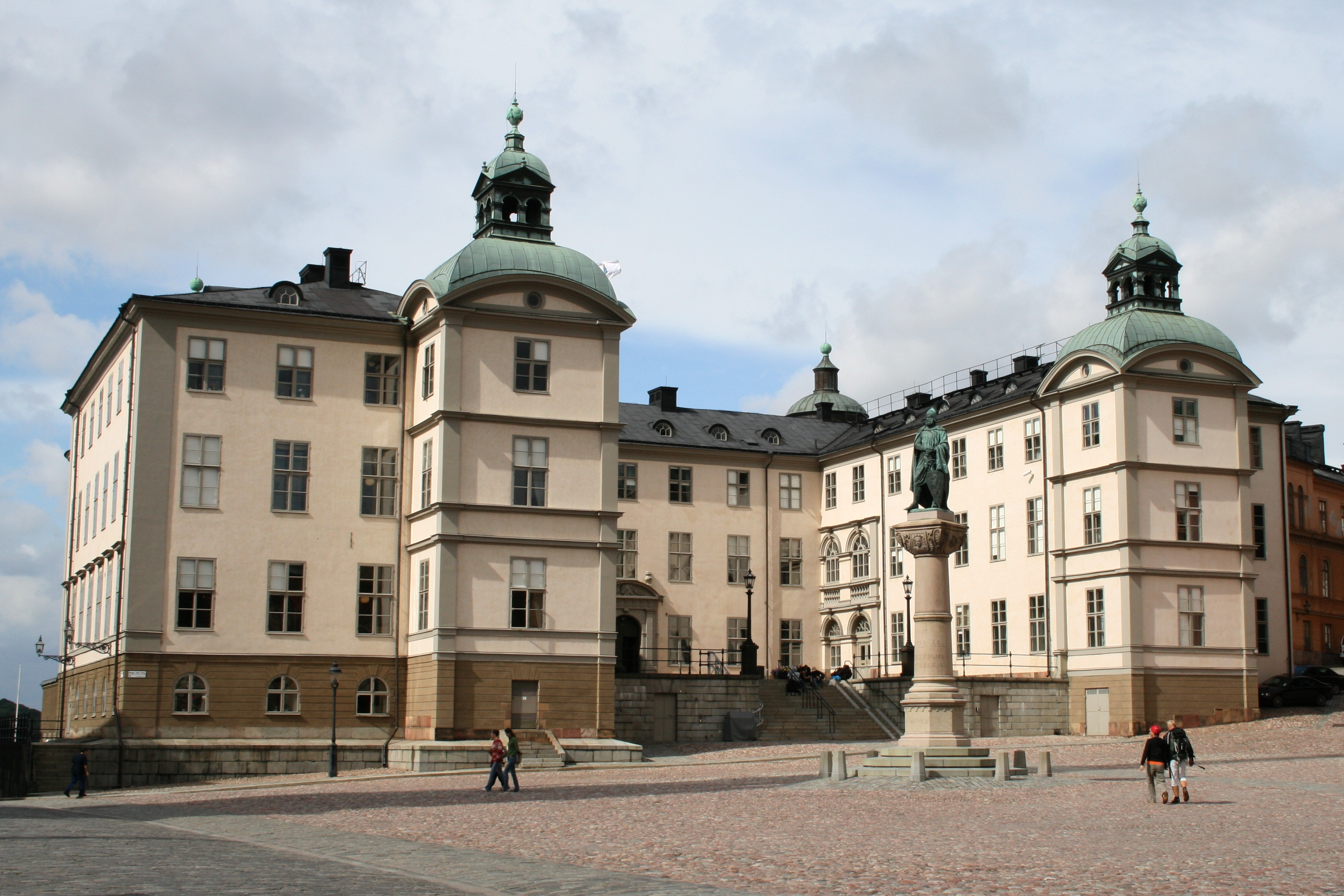
Wrangel Palace in Stockholm, Sweden

- New Satu Mare Chain Church in Romania, designed by Preinlich Sigismund, is completed.
- New St. George's Church, Dublin, Ireland, designed by Francis Johnston, is completed.
- The Temple of Saint Philip Neri in Guadalajara, Jalisco, Mexico is completed.
- The Four Courts in Dublin, designed by James Gandon, is completed.
- Rebuilding of Liverpool Town Hall in England under the direction of John Foster is completed.
- The Classen Library in Copenhagen, Denmark, designed by the benefactor Peter Hersleb Classen, presumably assisted by Andreas Kirkerup, is completed.
- Wildersgade Barracks in Copenhagen, designed by the architects and developers Jørgen Henrich Rawert and Andreas Hallander, is opened.
- Mežotne Palace in Latvia, designed by Johann Georg Adam Berlitz, is completed.
- Badenich Palace in Bejsce, Poland, designed by Jakub Kubicki, is built.
- Sedgeley, a mansion on the Schuylkill River near Philadelphia designed by Benjamin Henry Latrobe, is completed.
- Wrangel Palace in Stockholm, Sweden is rebuilt after a fire by Carl Christoffer Gjörwell.
- New dining room and conservatory for the Royal Pavilion, Brighton, England, designed by Peter Frederick Robinson, are completed.
- Monument to the Magdeburg Rights in Kyiv, Ukraine, designed by Andrey Melensky, is erected.

== Awards ==
- Grand Prix de Rome, architecture: Hubert Rohault de Fleury.

== Births ==
- January 22 – Richard Upjohn, English-born ecclesiastical architect working in the United States (died 1878)
- August 22 – Félix Marie Charles Texier, French architect and antiquary (died 1871)
- August 26 – George Wightwick, Welsh-born architect working in south west England and pioneer architectural journalist (died 1872)
- October 6 – James Bunstone Bunning, English architect (died 1863)

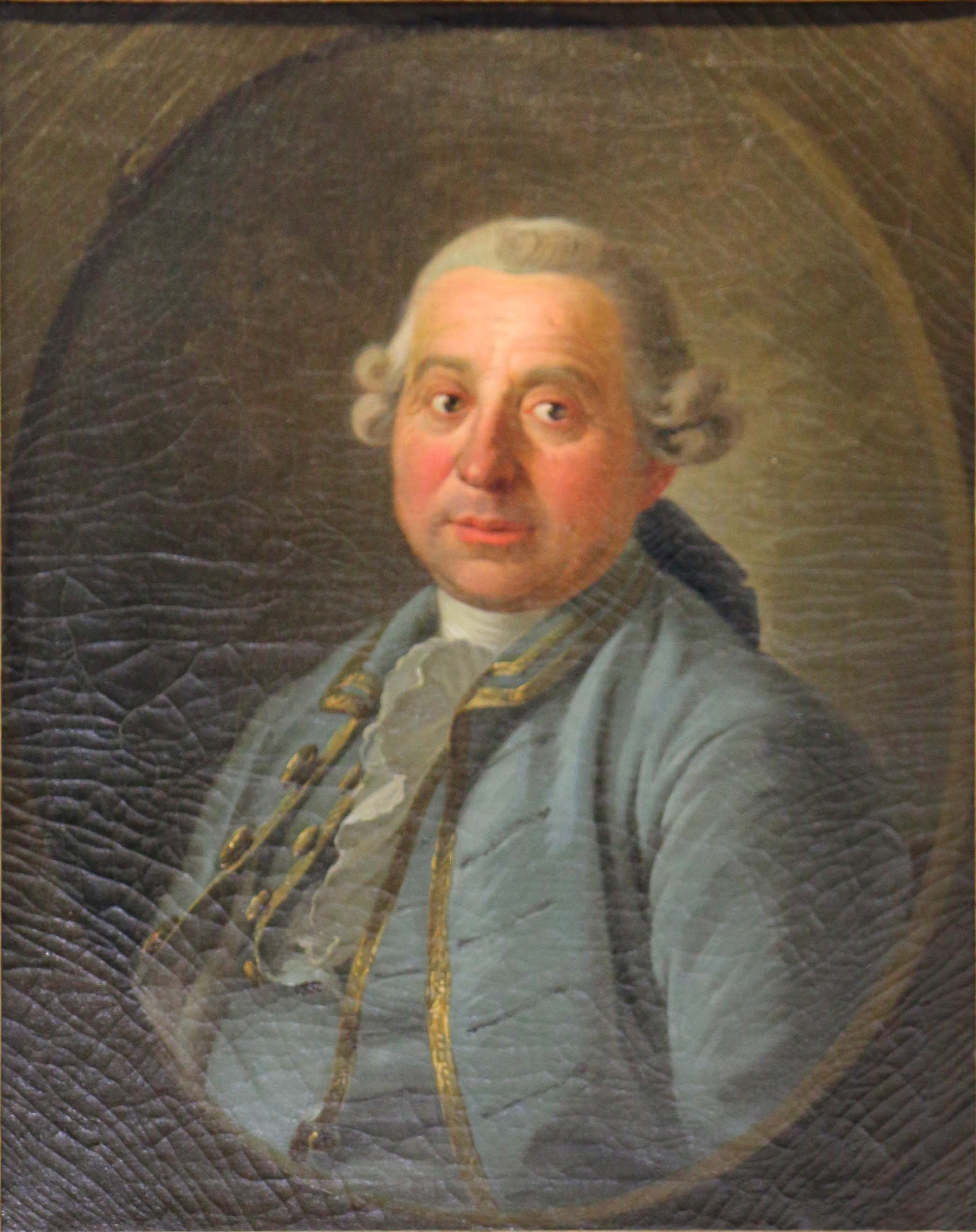
Esprit-Joseph Brun

- Stamatios Kleanthis, Greek architect (died 1862)
- Andrei Stackenschneider, Russian architect (died 1865)
- Ernst Friedrich Zwirner, Silesian-born architect working in Germany (died 1861)

== Deaths ==
- July 17 – Esprit-Joseph Brun, French architect (born 1710)
- John Whitehead, English amateur architect working in Portugal (born 1726)
