= Bellevue Palace =

Bellevue Palace may refer to:

- Bellevue Palace (Germany), the official residence of the President of Germany in Berlin
- Bellevue Palace (France) or Château de Bellevue
- Schloss Bellevue (Kassel), former palace complex in Kassel
- Bellevue Palace (Turkey), a former hotel in Ankara (also known as Belvü Palas)
- Hotel Bellevue Palace, a luxury hotel in Berne, Switzerland
