= 1804 in architecture =

The year 1804 in architecture involved some significant events.

== Buildings and structures ==
=== Buildings ===
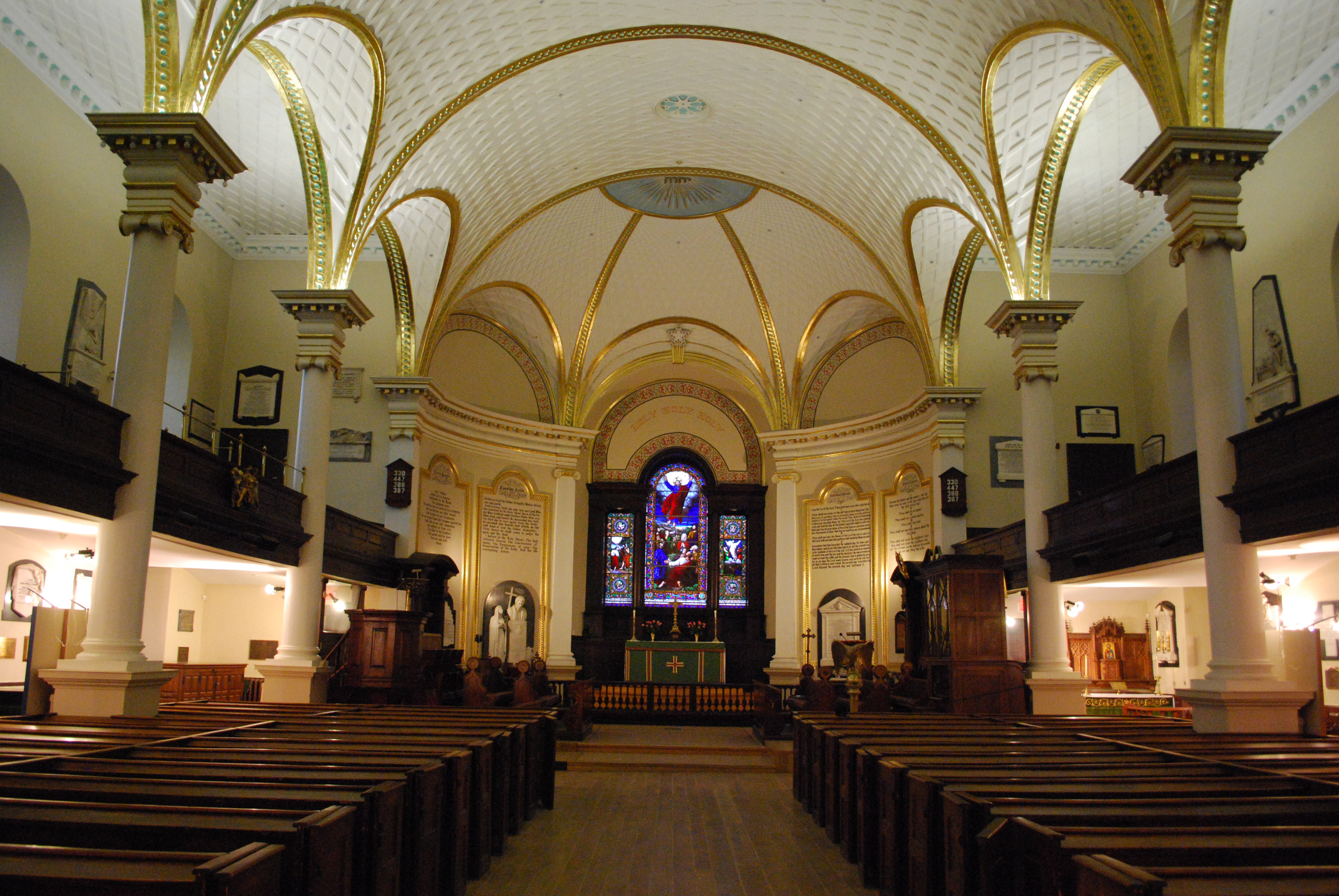
Cathedral of the Holy Trinity (Quebec)

- May 21 – Père Lachaise Cemetery in Paris, laid out by Alexandre-Théodore Brongniart, is opened.
- August 28 – Cathedral of the Holy Trinity (Quebec), designed by Major William Robe and Captain William Hall, is consecrated.
- The Government House in the Bahamas is completed.
- Montevideo Metropolitan Cathedral in Uruguay is consecrated.
- Dalongdong Baoan Temple in Taipei, Taiwan, is completed.
- The Pont des Arts in Paris, designed by Louis-Alexandre de Cessart and Jacques Dillon, is completed.
- Rostokino Aqueduct for Moscow water supply is completed by Colonel Ivan Gerard to the designs of Friedrich Wilhelm Bauer.

== Awards ==
- Grand Prix de Rome, architecture: Jules Lesueur.

== Births ==
- February 7 – William Tinsley, Irish architect working in the United States (died 1885)
- March 1 – John Henderson, Scottish ecclesiastical architect (died 1862)
- March 13 – Thomas Allom, English architect (died 1872)
- September 4 – Thomas Ustick Walter, American architect (died 1887)
- November 3 – Alexander Dick Gough, English architect (died 1871)
- December 19 – George Townsend Andrews, English architect known for railway stations in Yorkshire (died 1855)
- John S. Norris, American architect (died 1876)

== Deaths ==
- March 18 – Louis Jean Desprez, French painter and architect working in Sweden (born 1743)
- Nicholas Revett, English amateur architect (born 1720)
