= Margarethe Sömmering =

German artist (1768–1802)

Margarethe Sömmering, born Margarethe Elisabeth Grunelius (1768–1802) was a German painter.

Born in Frankfurt, Sömmering was the sister of a banker, and in 1792 married Samuel Thomas von Sömmering, who at the time was dean of the medical faculty at the University of Mainz. The couple moved to Frankfurt three years later. She was a pupil of Elisabeth Coengten and Johann Gottlieb Prestel, and was active as a portraitist and copyist, working in miniature and using watercolor and oils. She also produced engravings after Francesco Bartolozzi and Johann Heinrich Wilhelm Tischbein.
