= Ottoneum =

Ottoneum Museum of Natural History
- Naturkunde Museum im Ottoneum
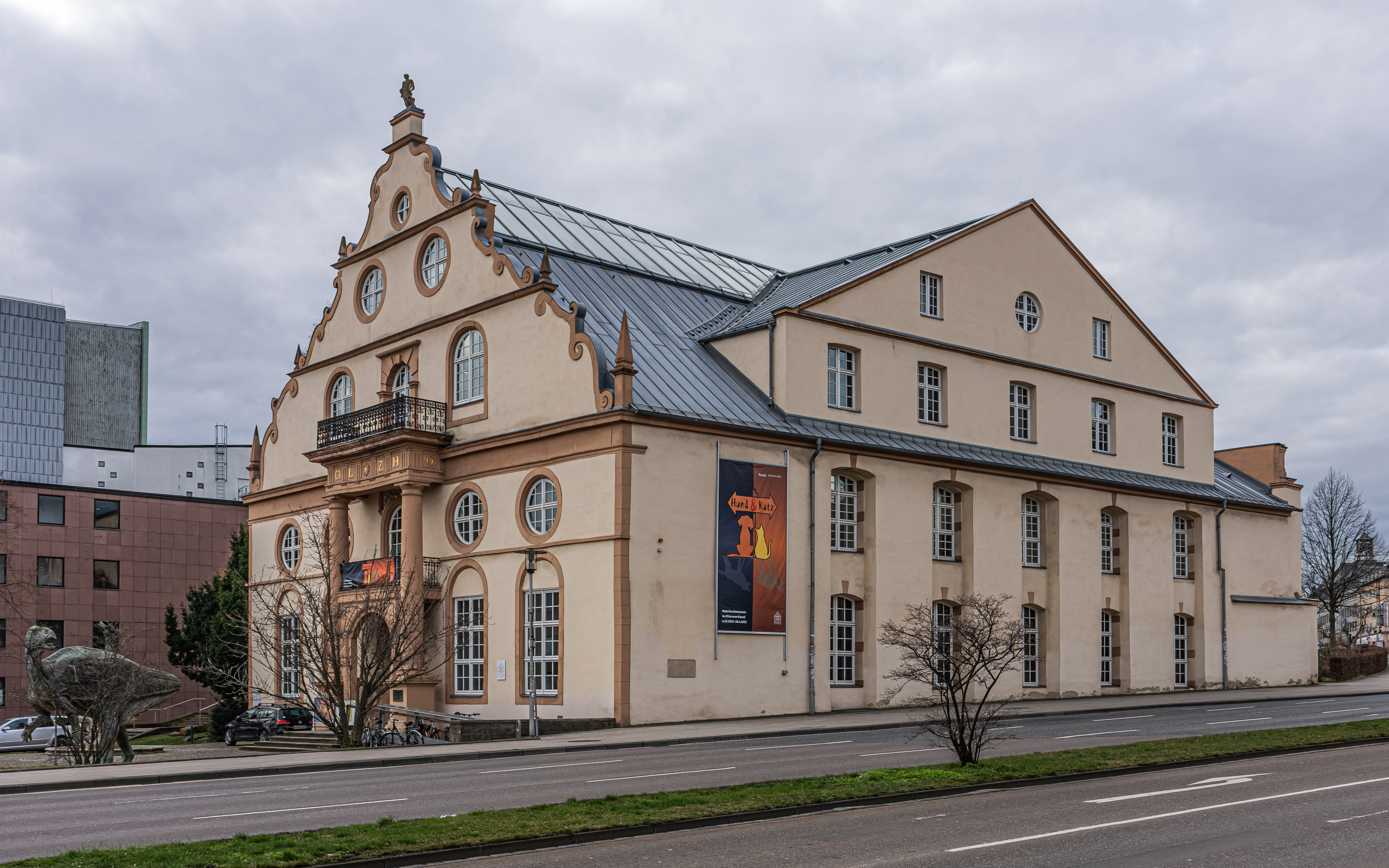
- Established: 1888
- Location: Kassel, Germany
- Coordinates: 51°18′48″N 9°29′56″E
- Type: Natural history museum
- Visitors: 333,007 (in 2012)
- Owner: City of Kassel
- Website: www.naturkundemuseum-kassel.de (in German)

The Ottoneum in Kassel, Germany was the first theater building built in Germany and is now a museum of natural history.

== History ==
The Ottoneum was built in 1606 under Landgrave Moritz by the architect William Vernukken. The name 'Ottoneum' comes from Landgrave Motiz's favourite son Otto. With the beginning of the Thirty Years' War (1618-1648) the Ottoneum's heyday as a cultural centre came to an end and the building was put to other uses. It was not until 1696 when the court architect Johann Conrad Giesler converted the building to house the Landgrave art and natural history collection. The work was ordered by Charles I, Landgrave of Hesse-Kassel (Landgrave Karl), and was undertaken by Master Builder Paul du Ry. In 1709 Karl founded the Collegium Carolinum, a scientific research centre with famous scholars Georg Forster and Samuel Thomas von Soemmerring at its core. It was during this time that the Ottoneum also housed an anatomical theatre and an observatory. By 1779 the Ottoneum was too small to house the large Landgrave collections and they were moved to the nearby Fridericianum Museum, where it became accessible to the public. A hundred years later when Kassel was a part of Prussia, natural objects were reintroduced into the Ottoneum, which was now under the title of "Preußisches Naturaliemuseum" (The Royal Prussian Kind Museum). The museum has been the Naturkundemuseum (Natural History Museum) since 1928 when possession of the museum was returned to the city. However, in October 1943, during World War II the building was damaged by fire and high explosive bombs, and more than half of the collection was lost. Based on historical plans, they were able to rebuild the Ottoneum again from 1949-1954. Since then, the collection has been increasing through purchases and donations from private collectors. Today the museum is not only a centre for scientific research, but also serves as a platform for discussion related to the protection and conservation of the environment.

== Collection ==
The Ottoneum is currently home to the Goethe Elephant Skeleton, which was lent to Goethe by Soemmerring for his anatomical research of the premaxilla. The elephant's skin that was preserved by Soemmerring was one of the casualties of the museum's fire in World War II.

Also housed is the Schildbach Wooden Library, which was created by Carl Schildbach from 1771 to 1799. This library is made up of 530 volumes which each serve as a representation of the flora present on various trees. Each part of the book, from the spine to the front page, is made up of the different sections of the specific tree. Specifications about the tree such as where it grows, what it looks like and how it changes with the seasons is also given. The Wooden Library is now presented in a cabinet constructed by American artist Mark Dion for documenta(13).

One of the oldest artifacts housed in the museum is the Ratzenberger Herbarium, created from 1556 to 1592. Here there are 700 pressed plants preserved in three large leather-bound volumes. The ordering of these plant species already hints at a natural arrangement and grouping of species, prior to the work of Carl Linnaeus.

The Ottoneum is also home to the varied history of the area of Kassel, beginning from the Permian period in the Paleozoic, through the Mesozoic, and finally through to the modern day in the Cenozoic, including the Ice Age. This includes multiple representations of large reptiles, dinosaurs and mammals from each era, including a life sized Iguanodon skeleton and a woolly mammoth.
