= 1708 in architecture =

The year 1708 in architecture involved some significant architectural events and new buildings.

== Events ==
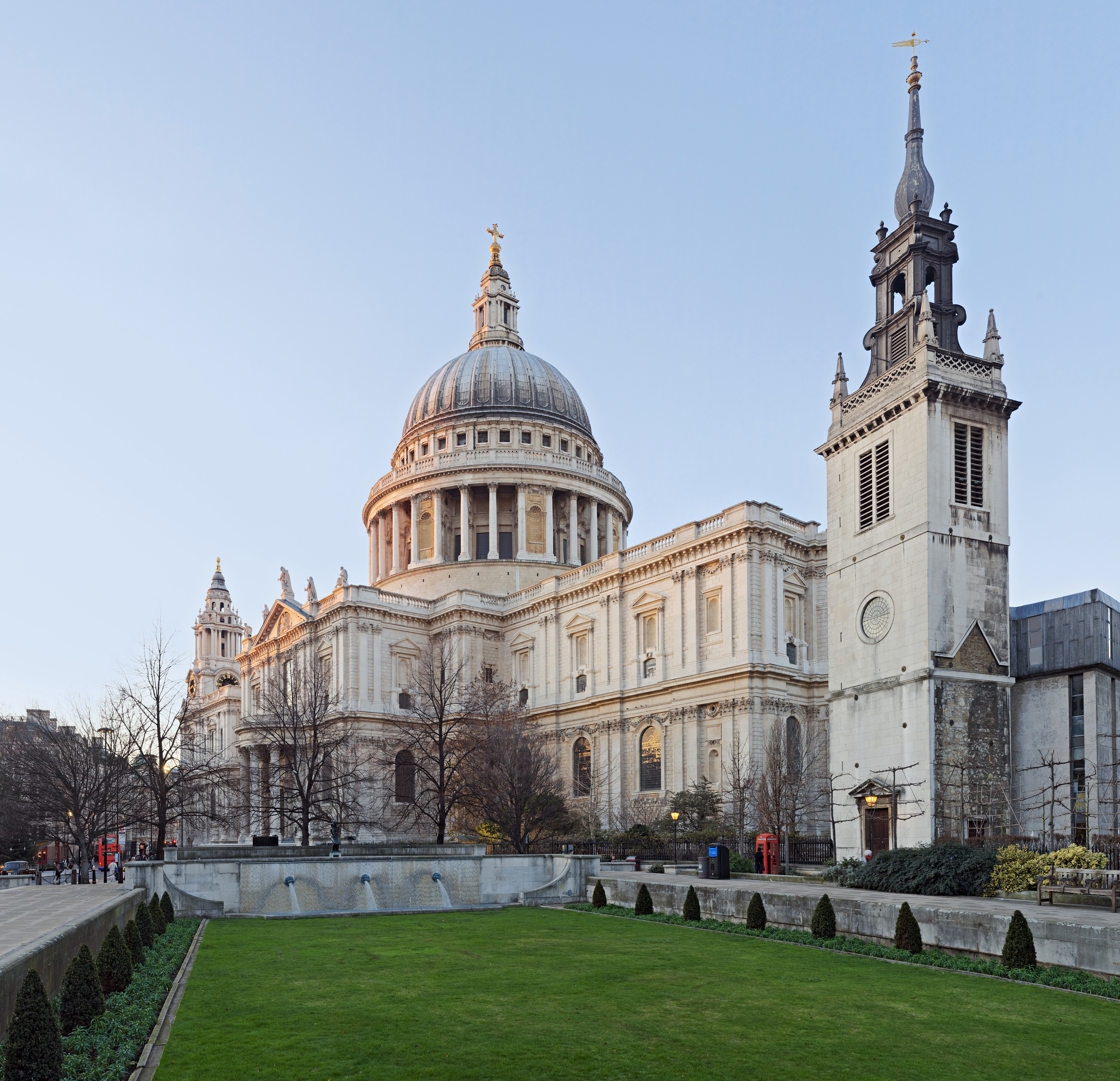
St Paul's Cathedral, London (with tower of St Augustine Watling Street)

- October 26 - St Paul's Cathedral in London, England, designed by Christopher Wren, is topped out

== Buildings and structures ==
=== Buildings completed ===
- Bonnington Pavilion, New Lanark, Scotland
- Haus zum Riesen, Heidelberg, Germany
- Newington Green Unitarian Church, London, England (later substantially altered)
- Taku Seibyō, Japan
- Taschenbergpalais, Dresden, Germany
- Tellicherry Fort, Kerala, India
- Wilbury House in Wiltshire, designed by William Benson

== Births ==
- October 27 – Jean-Rodolphe Perronet, French architect and structural engineer (died 1794)

== Deaths ==
- May 11 – Jules Hardouin Mansart, French architect (born 1646)
