= Collegium Carolinum (Kassel) =

Scientific institution in Kassel, Germany

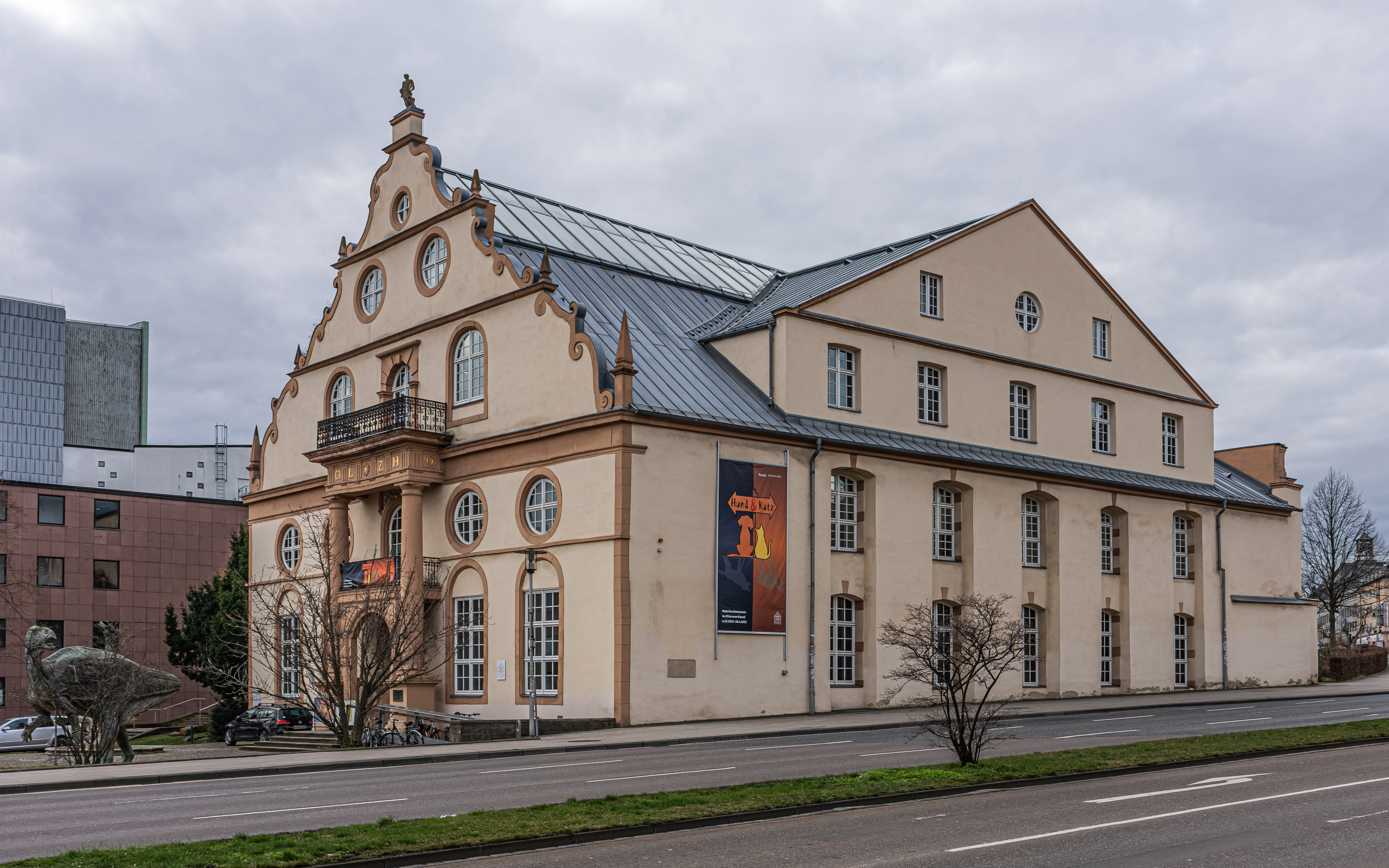
Ottoneum building, Kassel

The Collegium Carolinum (also known as Collegium illustre Carolinum) was a scientific institution in Kassel, Germany. It was founded in 1709 by Charles I, Landgrave of Hesse-Kassel and closed after the 1785 death of Frederick II, Landgrave of Hesse-Kassel. The Ottoneum housed most of its activities. However, a new anatomical theatre, the first in Germany, was used by Samuel Thomas von Sömmerring.

The Collegium Carolinum was founded as a "new kind of university", where mathematics, the sciences, anatomy and geography should be more important compared to the classical humanist subjects taught at the nearby University of Marburg. In 1766, it was reorganised into a polytechnic by Frederick II and concentrated more on the arts and applicable sciences.

== Notable professors ==
- Georg Forster, naturalist
- Johannes von Müller, historian
- Johann August Nahl, sculptor
- Simon Louis du Ry, architect
- Samuel Thomas von Sömmerring, anatomist
- Johann Heinrich Tischbein, painter

== See also ==
- Kunsthochschule Kassel
