= Schloss Bellevue (Kassel) =

Former palace in Kassel, Germany

Coordinates: 51.309839°N 9.493933°E

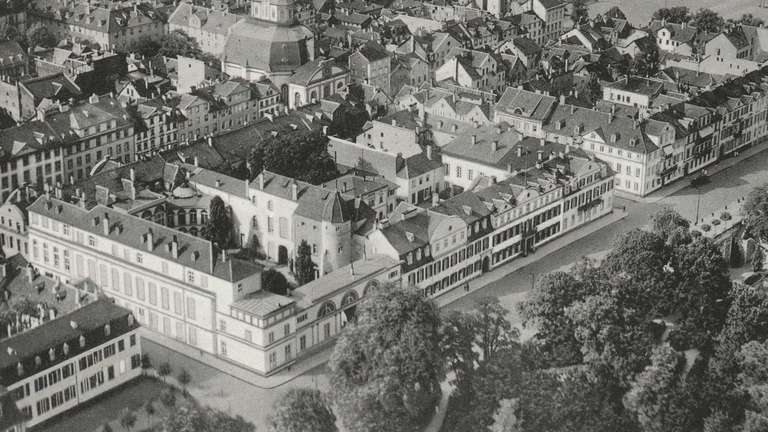
The Bellevueschloss from the air in the 1930s

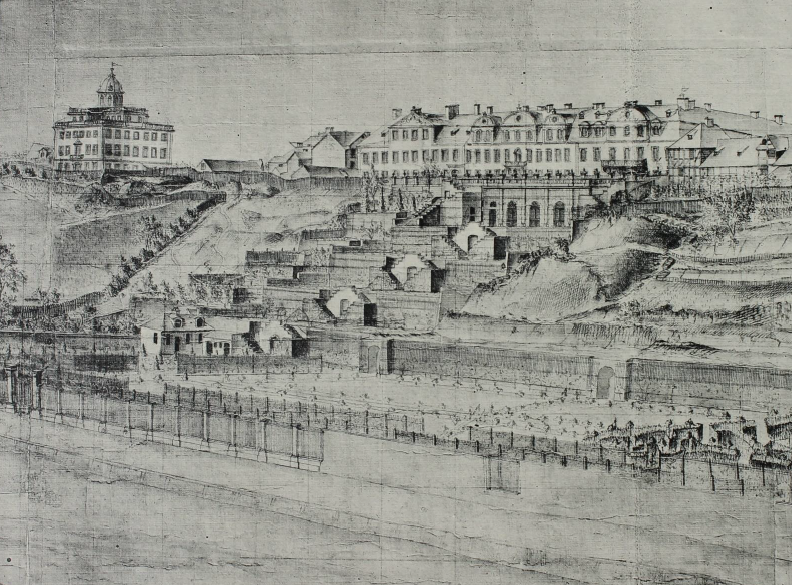
The Bellevueschloss in the 18th century, with the ‘Bellevue Palace’ building on the left

The Bellevueschloss or Schloss Bellevue was a palace complex in Kassel, Germany, which served as a residence of the Electors of Hesse-Kassel. It was located on the Schöne Aussicht (English: Beautiful view), with view of the Karlsaue park. The building complex consisted of various 18th-century palaces, which were combined at the start of the 19th century. In the 1930s, it housed the Landgrafenmuseum. For the most part, it was destroyed during the Second World War and not restored afterwards. With exception of the Bellevue Palace, nothing is left. Currently, the district court of Kassel stands on its location.

== History ==
=== 18th century ===
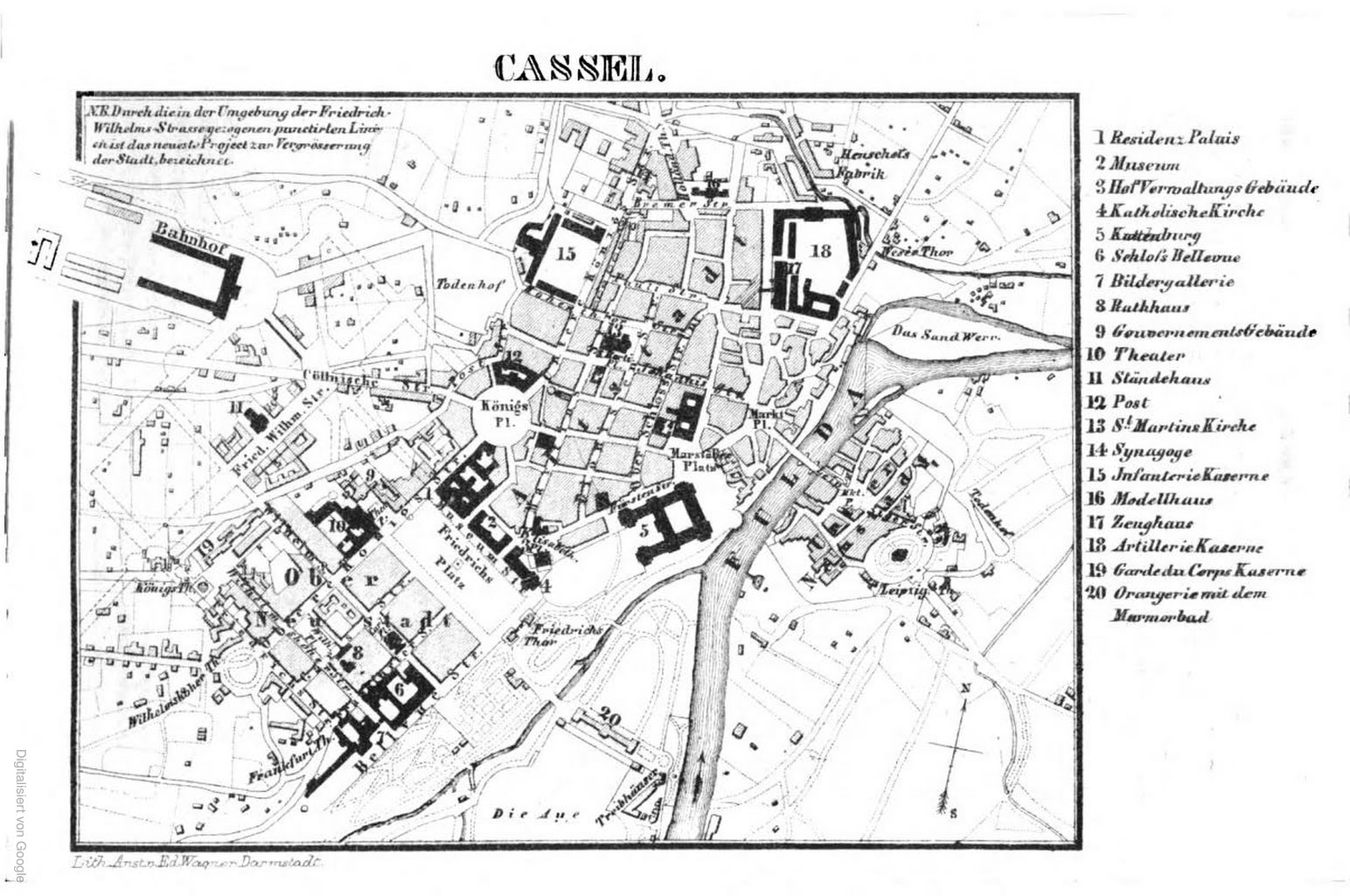
A map of Kassel in 1860: Number 1 represents the Residenzpalais, number 5 is the Chattenburg, and number 6 is Schloss Bellevue

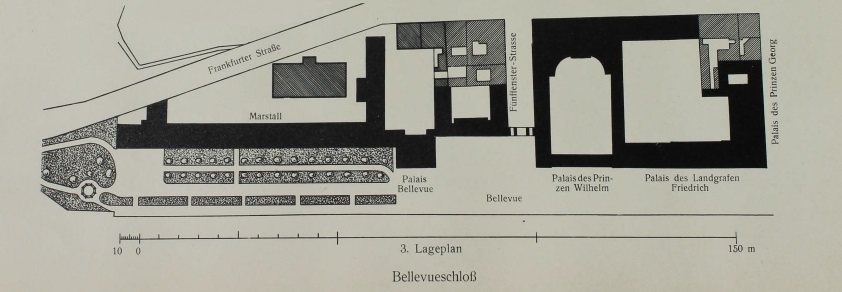
A plan of the Bellevueschloss showing its different components

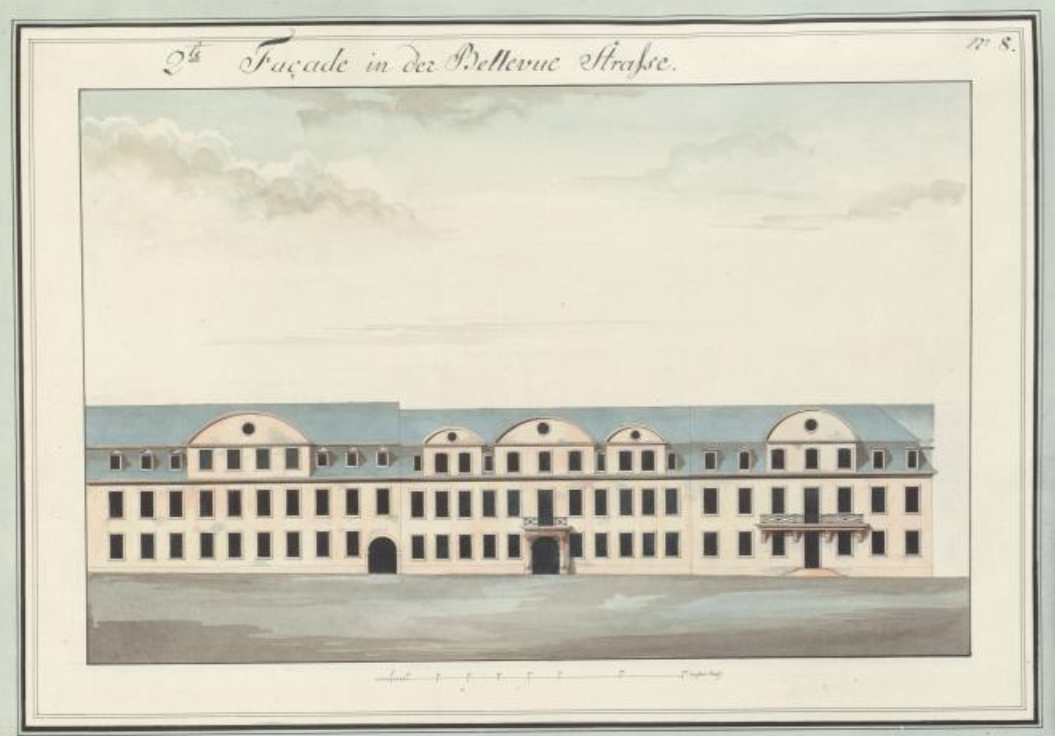
The facade towards the Schoene Aussicht

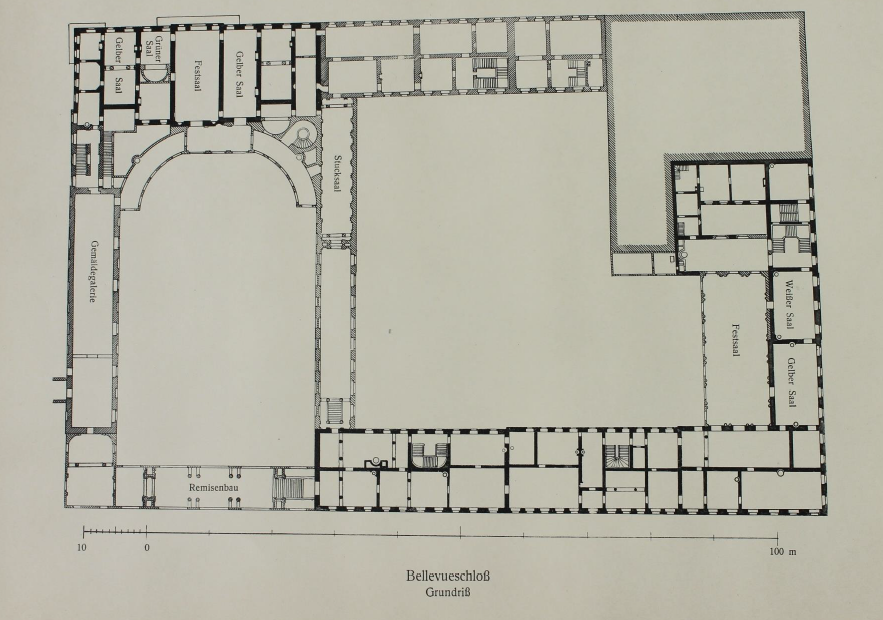
A plan of the main floor of the Bellevueschloss

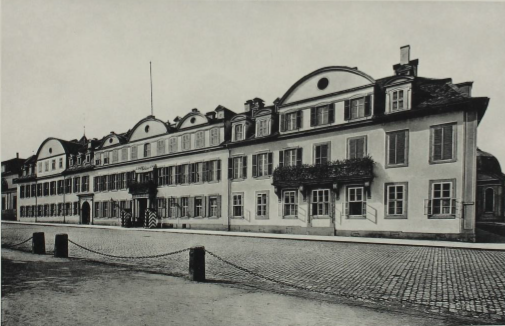
The facade of the palaces of landgraves Friedrich and Georg

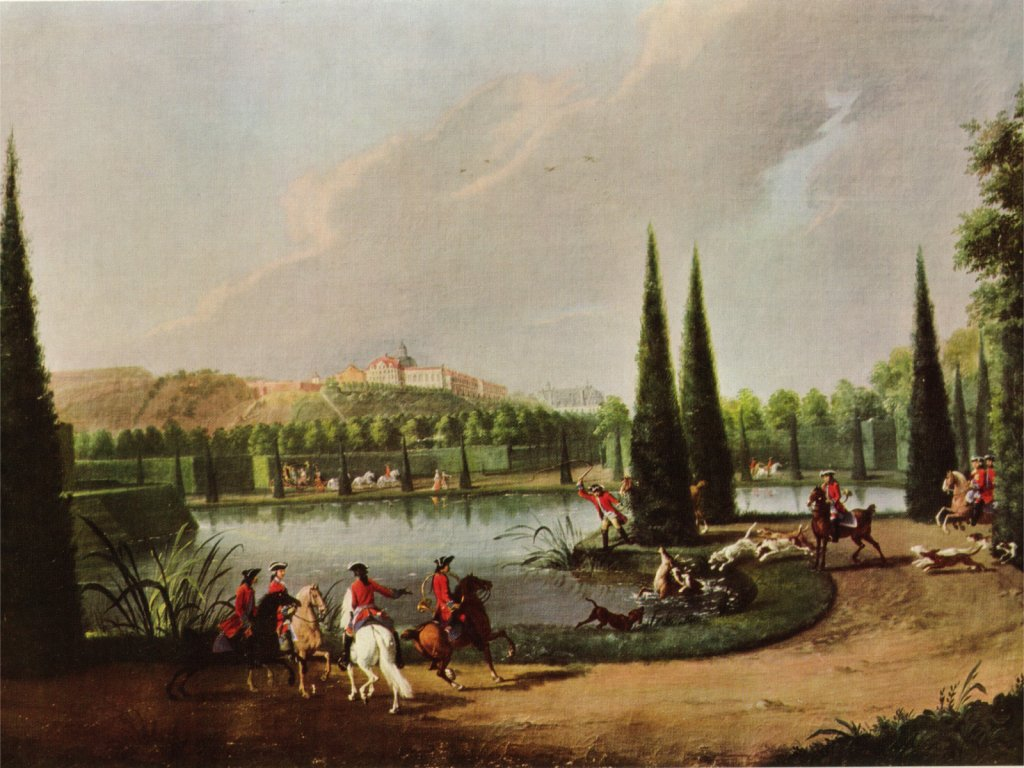
"Hunting in the Karlsaue" by Johann Heinrich Tischbein with Schloss Bellevue palace

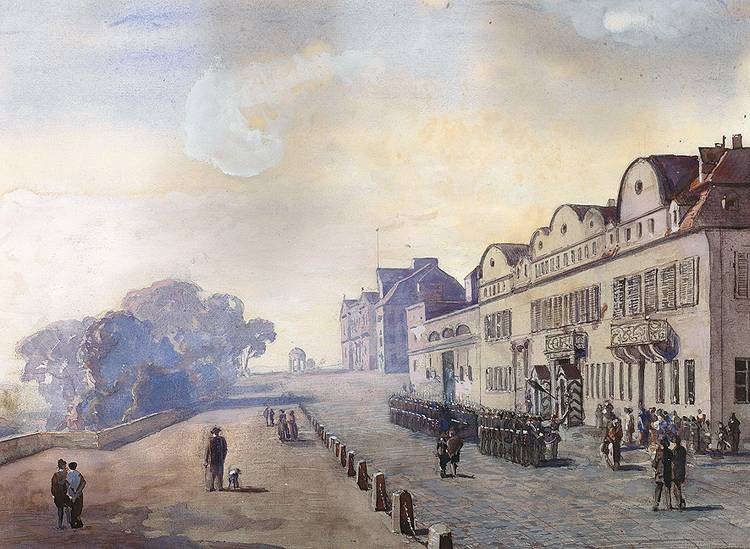
A painting of the Bellevueschloss by Louis Kollitz

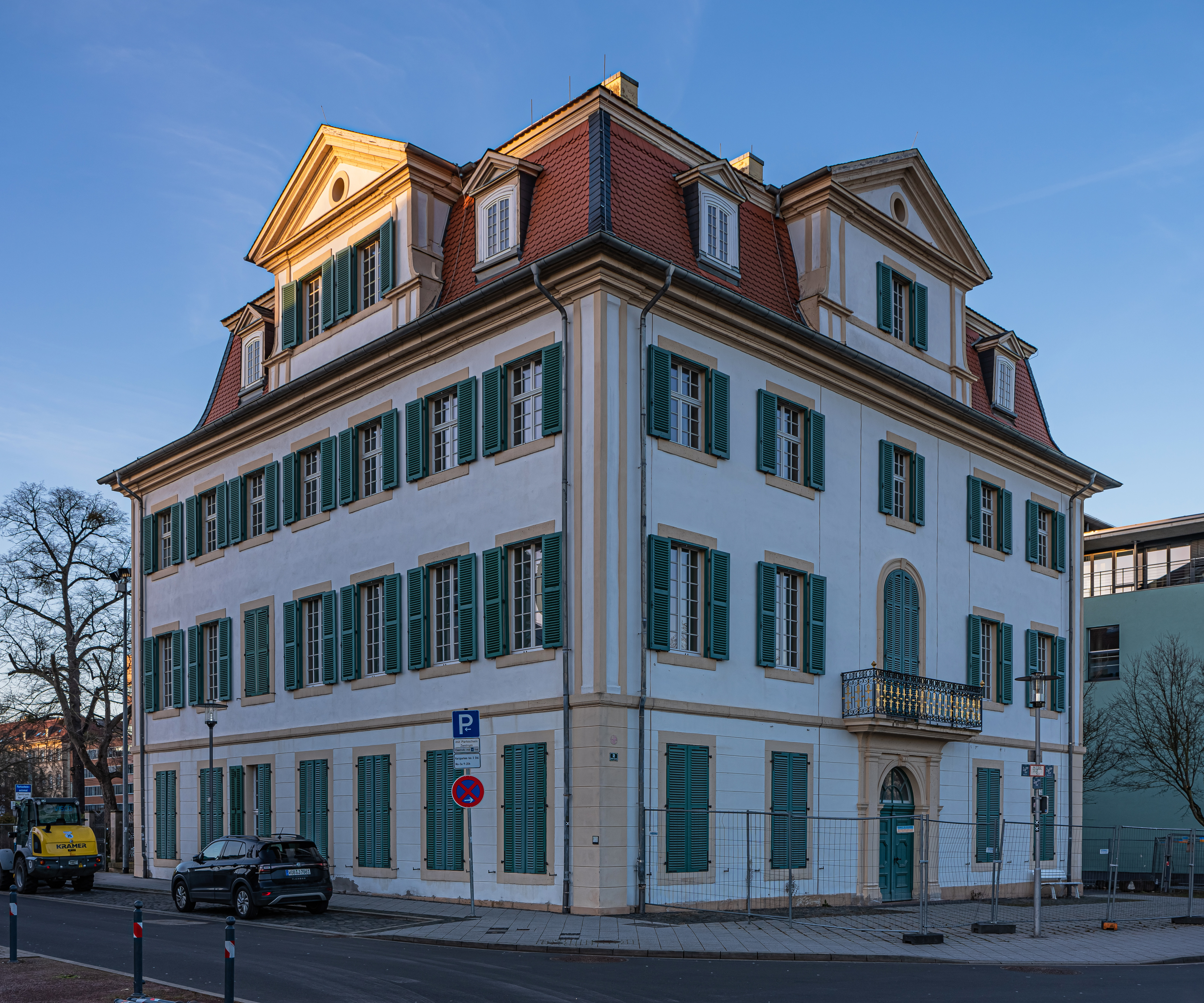
The ‘Bellevue Palace’ is the remaining part of the Bellevueschloss palace

The Bellevueschloss palace complex was located between the Schöne Aussicht, the Frankfurter Strasse, and the Fünffensterstraße. The building complex consisted of several 18th-century palaces and private houses, including:

- The Bellevue Palace building, constructed by the architect Paul du Ry for Charles I, Landgrave of Hesse-Kassel in 1714. Initially, it served as an observatory, before it became palace used by members of the princely family of Hesse. Further rebuilding around 1790 by Simon Louis du Ry for William I, Elector of Hesse;
- The palace of landgrave Friedrich was initially constructed as a private home, but was acquired by the princely family in 1763;
- The palace of prince Georg, constructed by Paul du Ry in 1709 as a two-storey building, which was extended with a banquet hall in 1825; and
- The palace of prince William, later landgrave William VIII of Hesse-Kassel, was constructed in the first half of the 18th century. It was extended with a paintings gallery between 1749 and 1751, and with the Remisenbau in 1813. The palace apartments were partly executed in rococo and partly in neoclassical style.

=== 19th century: Royal and Electoral residence ===
At the start of the 19th century, the various buildings were combined in one complex, which was named Bellevue in 1815, French for beautiful view.

During the Napoleonic area, the Electorate of Hesse became part of the Kingdom of Westphalia with Napoleon's brother, Jérôme Bonaparte as its king. Kassel was the capital. When the Kassel City Palace (German: Stadtschloss Kassel or German: Landgrafenschloss) burned down in 1811, Jérôme moved into the Bellevue palace and made it his main residence in Kassel. He engaged his court architect Grandjean de Montigny to modernize the state rooms.

After Jérôme was expelled in 1813 and William IX, later Elector William I of Hesse (1743–1821), returned, he continued to use Schloss Bellevue as his main residence in Kassel, while at the same time he started the construction of a new residential palace as replacement for the old city palace, the Chattenburg, a large neoclassical palace, which was never completed except for the basis. William II (1777–1847) also used Schloss Bellevue, although his main city residence was the Residenzpalais. Electress Augusta (1780–1841), who was estranged from William II, used the palace as her town house and summer residence.

=== Post 1866 into the 20th century ===
In 1866 Hesse was annexed to Prussia. The building was recovered by a branch of the princely family in 1880. From 1933 until the Second World War it was the residence of Philipp, Landgrave of Hesse (1896–1980), during his tenure as President of the province of Hesse-Nassau. In the mid-1930s Philipp made parts of the palace into a public art gallery, the Landgrafenmuseum. When Philipp was arrested in September 1943 on suspicion of plotting with the Italian royal family to overthrow Mussolini, the palace was plastered with posters denouncing the Italian royalty. Most of the palace complex was destroyed during Allied bombing raids in October 1943, with exception of the ‘Bellevue Palace’ building, which suffered little damage (although the north-eastern wing has been demolished).

The Landgrafenmuseum exhibited both pieces from the state art collection as well as from the princely collections (Kurhessische Hausstiftung). After the Second World War, the collections were split. The princely collections moved to Schloss Fasanerie near Fulda, where they were exhibited in a similar way to the Bellevueschloss, and still can be admired.

After the Second World War, the palace complex was not restored. The princely family sold the grounds and the remaining ‘Bellevue Palace’ building to the city of Kassel in 1956. The local district court stands on its location.

The ‘Bellevue Palace’ building was of the Municipal Art Collection up to 1970. Later it housed a museum dedicated to the Brothers Grimm, but nowadays it has become the Louis Spohr museum.
