= 1805 in architecture =

The year 1805 in architecture involved some significant events.

== Buildings and structures ==
=== Buildings ===
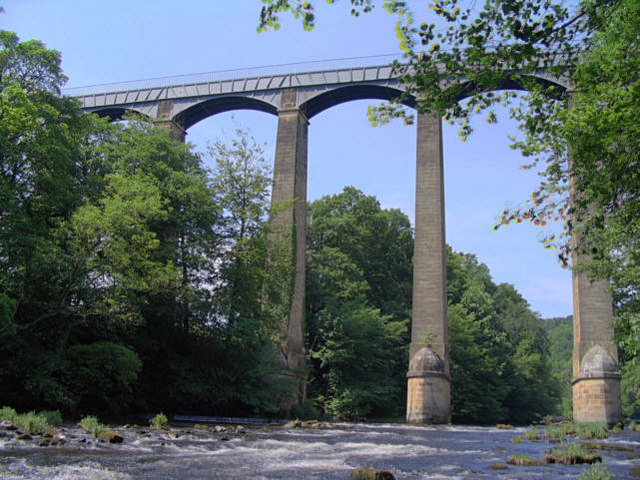
Pontcysyllte Aqueduct

- November 26 – The Ellesmere Canal's Pontcysyllte Aqueduct, designed by Thomas Telford and William Jessop, is opened on the border of Wales, the tallest and longest in Britain.
- Theatre Royal, Bath, England is opened.
- Evangelical Lutheran Church of Saint Mary in Saint Petersburg is built.
- Haga Palace in Stockholm, Sweden, designed by Carl Christoffer Gjörwell, is completed.

== Awards ==
- Grand Prix de Rome, architecture: Auguste Guenepin

== Births ==
- March 11 – Thomas Ellis Owen, English architect working chiefly around Southsea (d. 1862)
- June 9 – Victor Baltard, French architect (d. 1874)
- July 26 – John Miller, Scottish railway civil engineer (d. 1883)
- Peter Ellis, English architect working in Liverpool (d. 1884)
- James Salmon, Scottish architect (d. 1888)

== Deaths ==
- Peter Atkinson, English architect (b. 1725)
