= 1862 in architecture =

The year 1862 in architecture involved some significant architectural events and new buildings.

== Buildings and structures ==
=== Buildings opened ===
- May 8 – Church of St Philip and St James, Oxford, designed by George Edmund Street.
- May 12 – Ulster Hall, Belfast, designed by William J. Barre.
- May 17 – Teatro Comunale Florence, Italy.
- November 19 – Brekke Church, Norway, designed by Christian Henrik Grosch.

=== Buildings completed ===
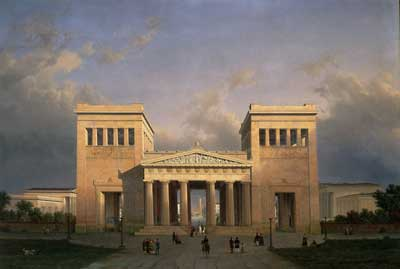
Propylaea (Munich), painted by the architect

- Flushing Town Hall, Flushing, Queens, New York, USA.
- Iron Clad Building, Cooperstown, New York, USA, designed by James Bogardus.
- Laxmangarh Fort, Rajasthan, India.
- Peace College Main Building, Raleigh, North Carolina, USA.
- Propylaea (Munich), designed by Leo von Klenze.
- Rila Monastery, Bulgaria, by Alexi Rilets (reconstruction).
- Government House, Queensland, Brisbane, Australia, designed by Charles Tiffin.
- Treasury Building, Melbourne, Australia, designed by J. J. Clark in 1857 (when he was 19).
- Great Malvern railway station, England, designed by E. W. Elmslie.
- Bow Bridge (Central Park), New York, designed by Calvert Vaux.

== Awards ==
- RIBA Royal Gold Medal – Robert Willis.
- Grand Prix de Rome, architecture: Wilbrod Chabrol.

== Births ==
- February 7 – Bernard Maybeck, American Arts and Crafts architect (died 1957)
- February 19 – Lev Kekushev, Russian Art Nouveau architect (died 1916–1919?)
- May 28 – Theodor Fischer, German architect (died 1938)
- June 9 – Herbert Baker, English architect working in South Africa (died 1946)
- October 21 – Folke Zettervall, Swedish architect (died 1955)
- October 31 – Gerald Horsley, British architect (died 1917)
- December 7 – Hans-Georg Tersling, Danish architect working in France (died 1920)

== Deaths ==
- June 27 – John Henderson, Scottish ecclesiastical architect (born 1804)
- December – Thomas Oliver, English classical architect (born 1791)
- Thomas Ellis Owen, English architect working chiefly around Southsea (born 1805)
