= Karlskirche, Kassel =

Coordinates: 51°18′42″N 9°29′41″E

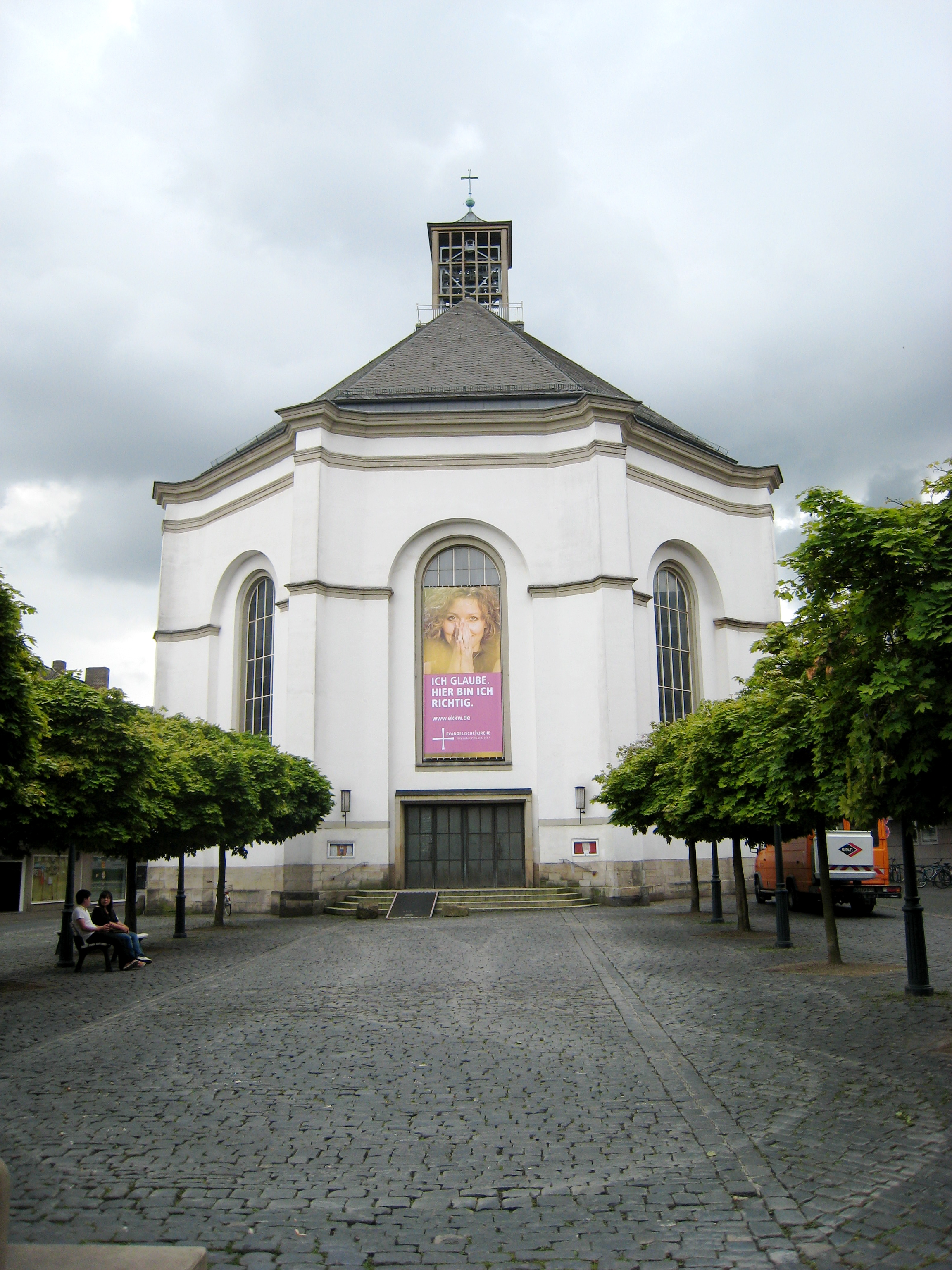
Church after reconstruction

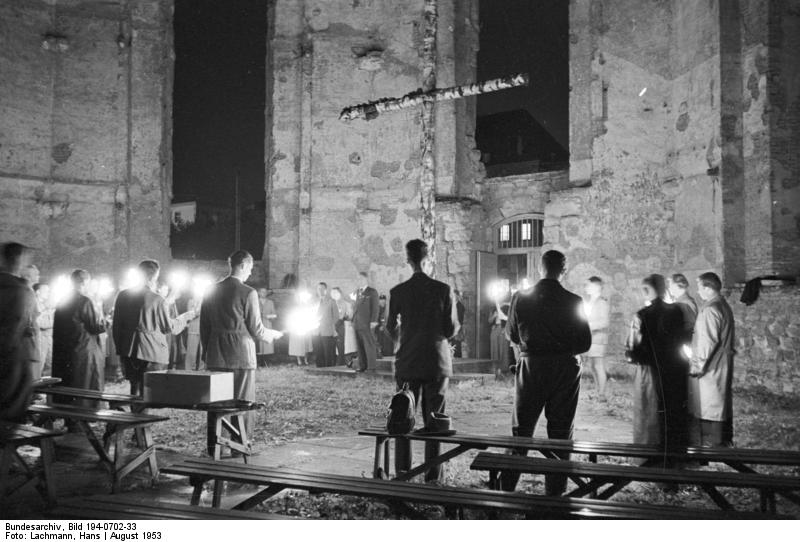
Service of the CVJM in the ruined church, 1953

The Karlskirche in Kassel (also Oberneustädter Kirche) is a Protestant church built by Paul du Ry in 1710 for the local Huguenot community.

The church was the location of a hundred-day sound installation by John Cage in 1987.
