= Simon Louis du Ry =

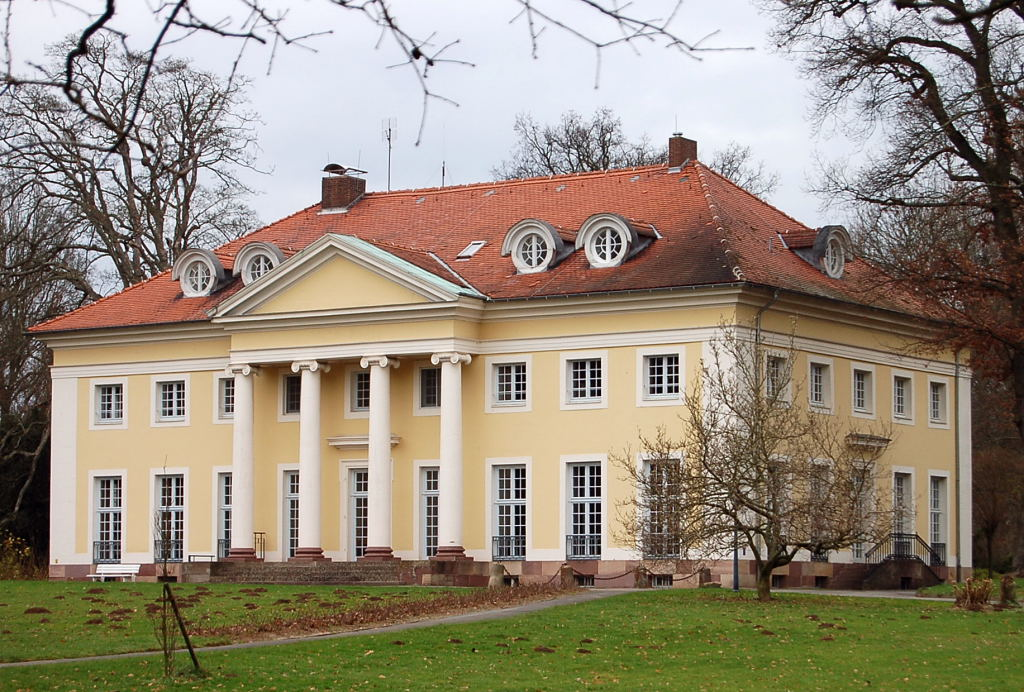
Hofgeismar-Schönburg castle

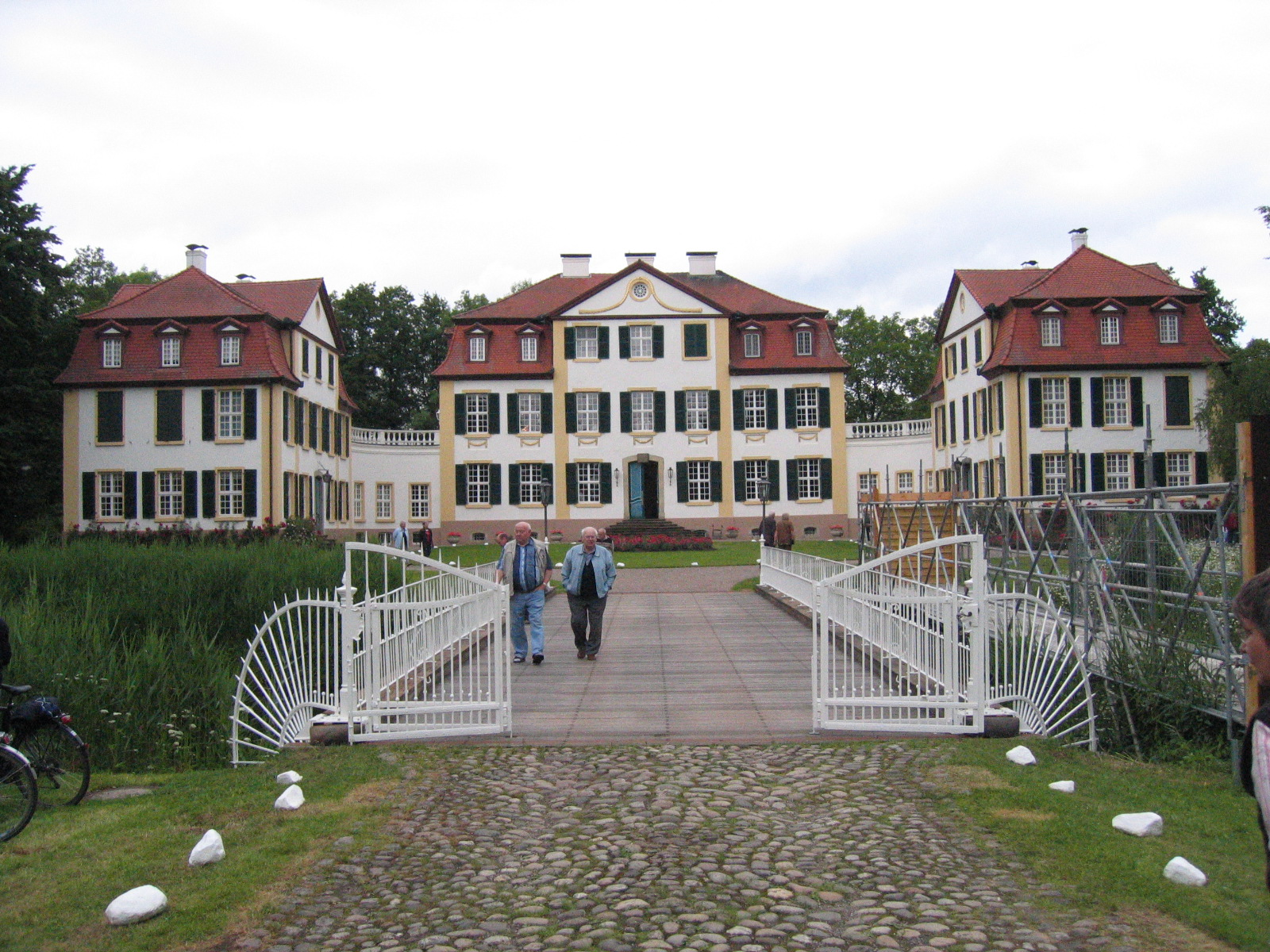
Hüffe castle

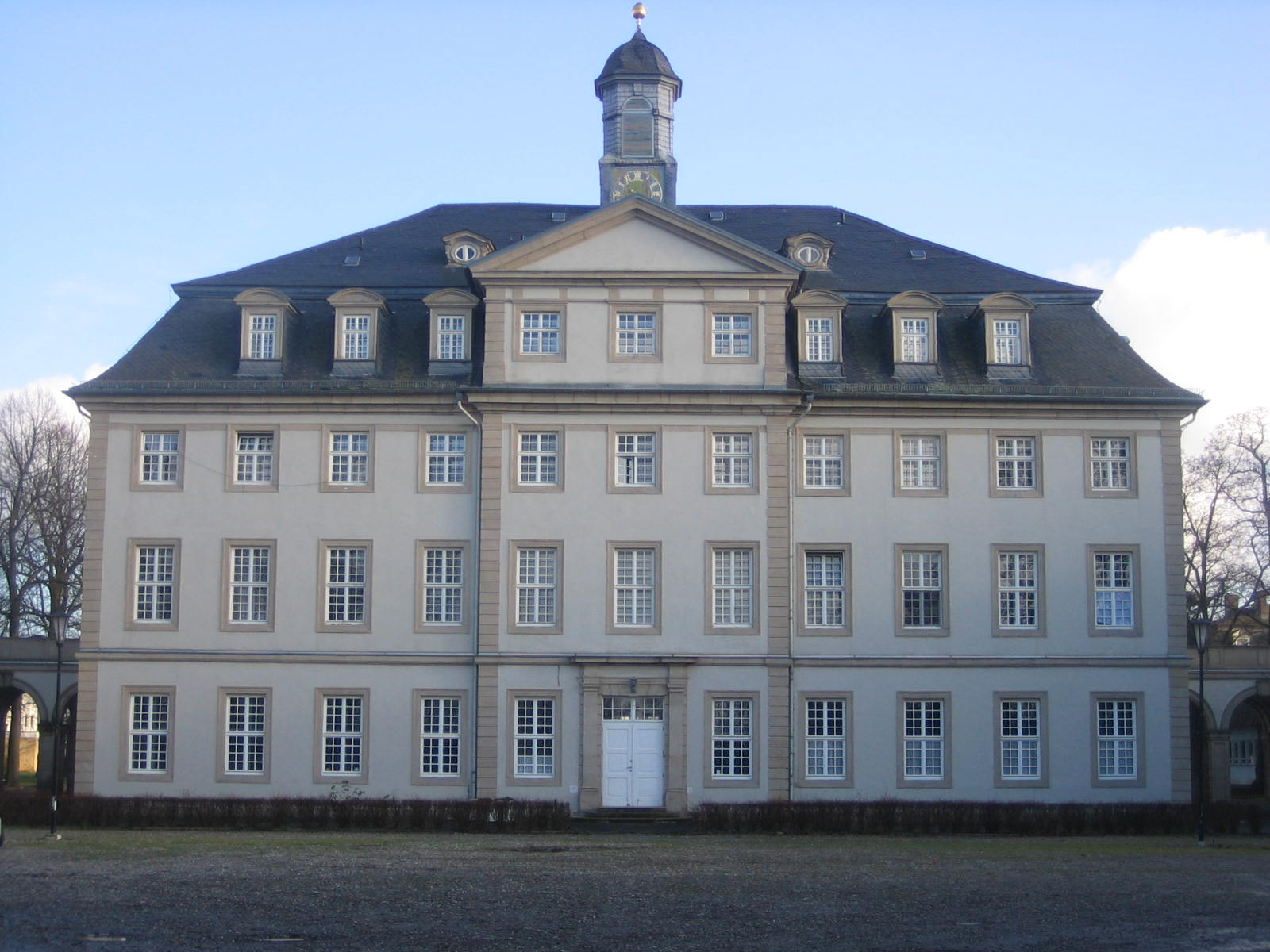
Wabern castle

Simon Louis du Ry (13 January 1726 – 23 August 1799) was a classical architect.

== Biography ==
Simon Louis du Ry was born in Kassel. He was the son of the Huguenot architect Charles du Ry and grandson of Paul du Ry of Kassel. He was from a French refugee family, who after the revocation of the Edict of Nantes by Louis XIV had to leave France and went to Hessen under Landgrave Charles. After beginning studies in Stockholm, Sweden, from 1746 to 1748 he was disappointed in his teacher Carl Hårleman and left for Paris to attend the architectural school of Jacques-François Blondel (École des Art) from 1748 until 1752. After further educational trips in France and Italy he returned to Kassel and became chief architect on the court after the death of this father. In 1766 he was installed as professor architectura civilis at the Collegium Carolinum in Kassel.

Under Frederic of Hessen he was responsible for the transformation of the old and partly destroyed town of Kassel into a modern capital. The Königsplatz (Kings square) and the Friedrichsplatz (Frederics square) remain the main squares in Kassel.

He died in 1799 in Kassel.

== Works ==
- Kitchen Pavilion of the Orangerie in the Karlsaue, 1765–66, completed in 1770
- Garde du Corps Barracks
- Auebridge
- Opera house in Kassel, 1766–69
- Königsplatz (Royal Square), 1767
- Palace of Jungk, 1767–69
- Weißensteiner gate, from 1768–70
- Fridericianum, 1769–76
- Friedrichsplatz (Kassel), 1769
- Palais Waitz, from 1770
- Comedy House
- Opera Square (Kassel), 1770
- Elizabeth Church (Kassel), c. 1770
- (Old) Royal Gate (Kassel), from 1775
- Friedrichstor / Auetor, 1779–82
- Brothers Grimm-Platz (Wilhelmshöher Platz), 1781
- William Bridge, from 1788
- Model house, after 1789
- Parish, Kirchditmold, 1790–92
- Bellevue Palace (Draft Paul du Ry ), conversion to 1790

Simon Louis du Ry designed and executed many castles and palaces including:

- Castle Wilhelmsthal, Calden, (1749), 1756–58
- Well Windhausen, Niestetal district Heiligenrode, 1769
- Wabern hunting lodge, extension 1770
- Castle Hüffe, Prussian Oldendorf Lashorst district, 1775–84
- Fürstenberg Castle, 1776–83
- Castle Mountain Home (Eder), 1785–86
- Wilhelmshöhe Castle, Kassel, 1786
- Schönburg castle, Hofgeismar, 1787–89
- House Kassel and landgrave house, bath nominal village, 1790/91
