= Auguste Guenepin =

French architect

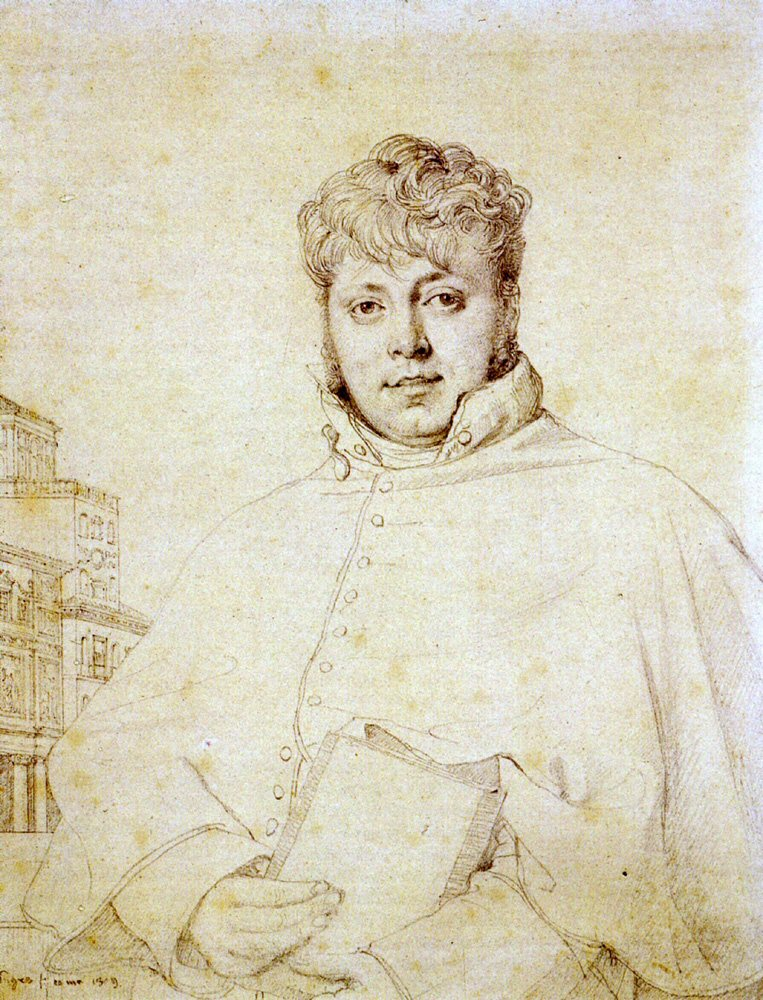
Auguste Guenepin, by Dominique Ingres

Auguste Jean Marie Guenepin (17 June 1780 – 5 March 1842) was a French architect.

Guenepin was born and died in Paris. He was the son of Étienne François Edmé Guenepin (1752-24 December 1827) and Marie Madeleine Delfau (1753–1808) and Aimée Desenne's husband.

In 1805, he won the Grand Prix de Rome for architecture. In 1833, he was appointed at the Institut de France (Académie des Beaux-Arts).

== Main works ==
- Slaughterhouse of Montmartre
- Chapel of L'Île-Saint-Denis
- Church of Noisy-le-Sec
- Restoration of the Abbey of Saint-Germain-des-Prés in Paris
- Restoration of the Sainte-Anne chapel of Notre-Dame de Paris
