= Paul du Ry =

French architect (1640–1714)

Jean Paul du Ry
- Born: 1640; Paris, France
- Died: 21 June 1714 (aged 73–74); Kassel, Hesse
- Occupation: Architect

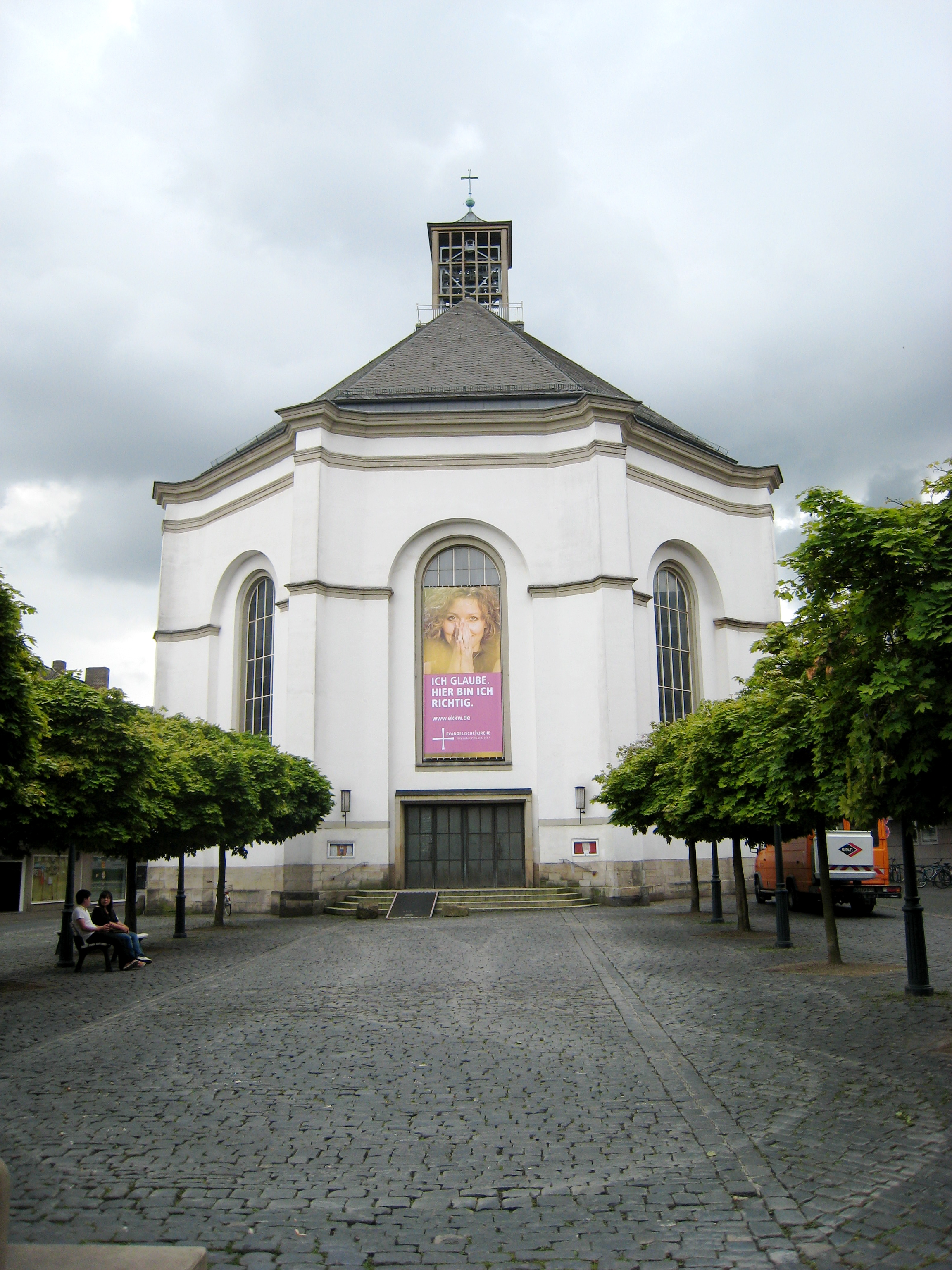
Karlskirche after restoration

Jean Paul du Ry (1640 – 21 June 1714) was a French architect and Huguenot refugee who was responsible for a number of baroque buildings in Kassel, Hesse, Germany.

== Origins ==
Jean Paul du Ry came from a family of French architects. His father was Mathurin du Ry (died circa 1680), court architect in Paris, and his grandfather was Charles du Ry, also a court architect in Paris. Paul du Ry was trained by the architect François Blondel (1618–1686) in Paris.

== Career ==
Paul du Ry was persecuted for his Calvinist faith, and at an early age moved to the Netherlands where he mainly worked as a military engineer in Maastricht. During this period he became acquainted with Dutch Baroque classicism. He went back to Paris in 1674. In 1685 he returned to the Netherlands, then moved to Hesse in 1688. The Stadtholder William III of Orange gave him a recommendation to Charles I, Landgrave of Hesse-Kassel.

The Landgrave employed Paul du Ry as court architect and director of engineering in Kassel. Du Ry was charged with building the Oberneustadt ("Upper New Town") district as a refuge for Huguenots who had been expelled from France in 1685. The district lay to the southwest of the old town on the left bank of the Fulda. He undertook many works here and elsewhere in Kassel for the Landgrave.

Paul du Ry died in Kassel on 21 June 1714. The works he had started were continued by his son, Charles Louis de Ry (1692–1757), and completed by his grandson Simon Louis du Ry (1726–1799.

== Works ==
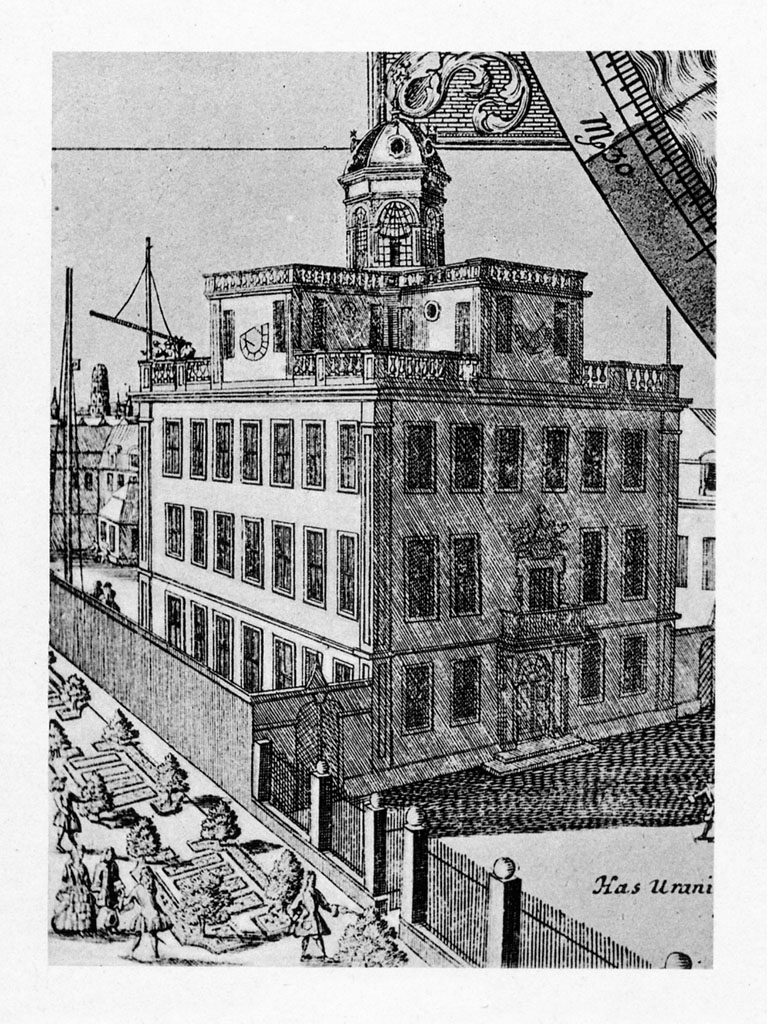
Bellevue Palace in 1742, used as an observatory by Johann Gabriel Doppelmayr

The Oberneustadt was laid out in six large rectangular blocks on a terrace overlooking the Fulda. It extended to the southwest of the old town, from which it was separated by a newly created square. Du Ry connected the Oberneustadt ramparts to the existing fortifications. There is an octagonal church in the center, the Karlskirche, built between 1698 and 1706 and consecrated in 1710. The houses were two or three stories high, with plastered facades. Some had gables and balconies. They were plain but uniform and well-proportioned. Many of them were destroyed in World War II (1939–1940).

Paul du Ry also laid out the model village of Carlsdorf and its surrounding agricultural land for a group of Huguenot refugees. The village was named after the Landgrave. In Kassel in 1696 Du Ry remodelled the Ottoneum theatre, designing the porch with double balcony and the sides. The Ottoneum was the first permanent theatre in Germany, designed by Wilhelm Vernukken and built in 1604-05 for the Landgrave Maurice the Learned. Du Ry converted the building into an art gallery to hold the Landgrave Charles's paintings, biological and astronomical objects and curiosities. In 1885 it became a natural history museum.

Between 1703 and 1711 Du Ry designed the Schloss Wilhelmshöhe, now a museum, probably the most typical of the Huguenot structures in the city, and the Palais Prinz Georg. He may have been involved in the design of the Orangerie in the Karlsaue, but this is debated. He built the Bellevue Palace in 1714, now a museum devoted to the Brothers Grimm. This was originally an observatory for the Landgrave Charles I. His buildings follow the Dutch rather than French tradition of Baroque Classicism.
