= Fridericianum =

Museum in Kassel, Germany

Coordinates: 51°18′49″N 9°29′51″E

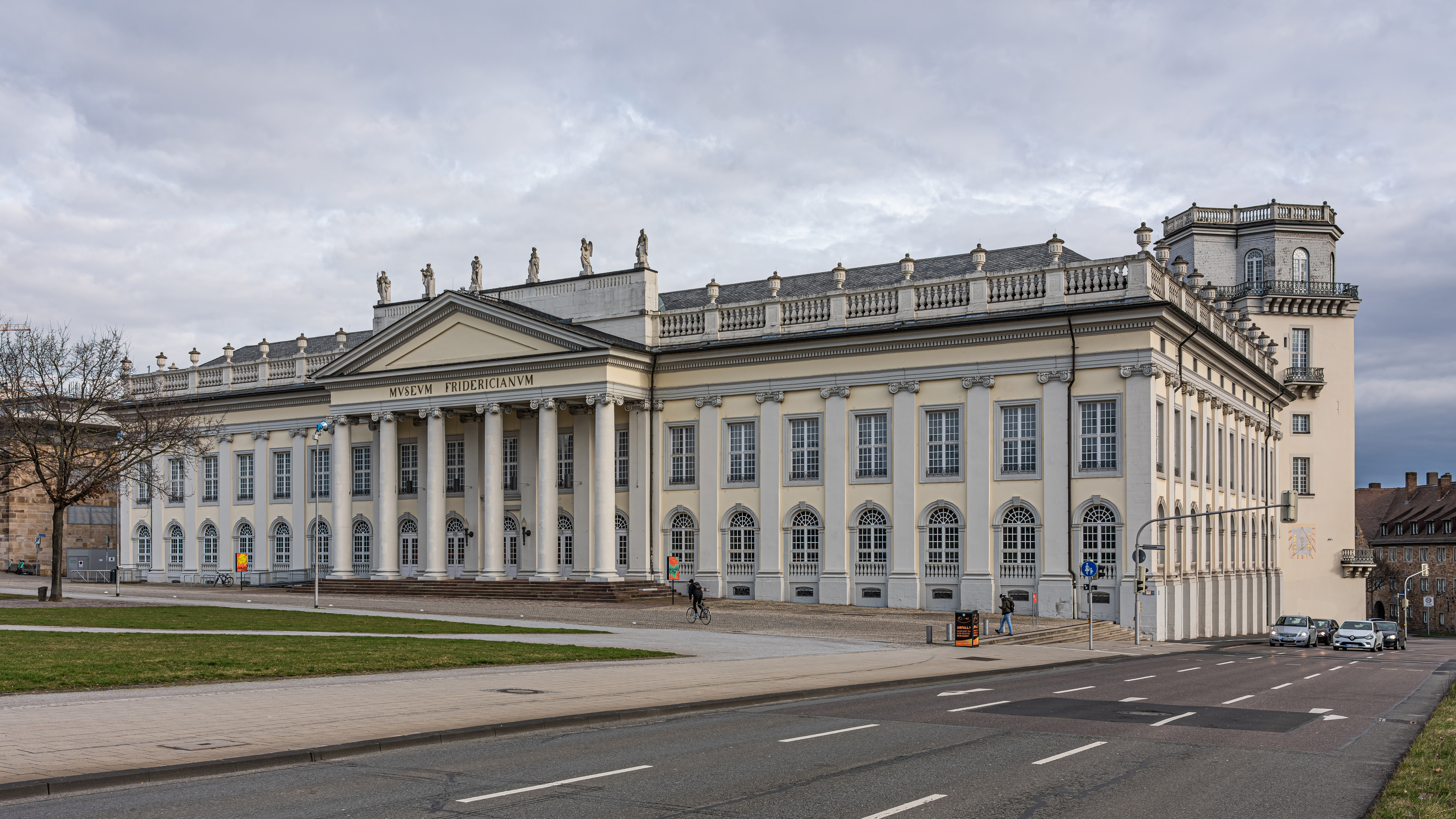
The Fridericianum in 2022

Fridericianum, Kassel

The Fridericianum is a museum in Kassel, Germany. Built in 1779, it is one of the oldest public museums in Europe. Since 1955, the quinquennial art festival documenta has been centred on the site, with some artworks displayed on Friedrichsplatz, in front of the building.

The exhibition building itself was fully renovated by 1982. Ever since 1988, Fridericianum has continually hosted changing exhibitions of contemporary art. Since June 2013, Susanne Pfeffer has been director of the Fridericianum.

== History ==
=== Museum ===
Having sold soldiers to the British, Frederick II, Landgrave of Hesse-Kassel used his riches to build one of the earliest public museum buildings in Europe, which was to stand on the recently laid out parade square in Kassel. The Fridericianum was designed by Huguenot architect Simon Louis du Ry for Landgrave Friedrich II and opened in 1779.

An encyclopedic museum, the Fridericianum originally housed the state library of Hesse, the art collections of the Hessian landgraves, including the "Modern Statue Gallery", as well as a medal, machinery and watch room, a print room, a manuscripts room and map gallery, scientific instruments, cork models of Roman architecture, and wax figures of historic Hessian landgraves. By the end of the 19th century the museum held one of the largest collections of watches and clocks in the world, and with the 1926 changing of the spelling of the town to Kassel, the name became synonymous to licensed clock making. The Fridericianum also contained a library built to house 100,000 volumes, and was connected to the medieval Zwehrenturm tower, which had been made into an observatory.

=== Parliamentary ===
When, in the early 19th century, Napoleon's youngest brother Jérôme Bonaparte became King of Westphalia and Kassel was named the capital of the kingdom, the Fridericianum was repurposed as the first parliamentary building in Germany. With Jérôme's expulsion in 1813, Fridericianum was returned to its original purpose as a museum. During that time, the Brothers Grimm, Jacob and Wilhelm, were employed at the library.

=== Library ===
With the beginning of Prussian rule in 1866, the museum's collections were gradually transferred to the Prussian center of power in Berlin, and in 1913 Fridericianum ceased to function as a museum, retaining only its status as a state library. The Fridericianum was heavily damaged in World War II, during the bombing raids on Kassel in 1941 and 1943. After the war, all that remained of the Fridericianum and library were the enclosing walls and the Zwehrenturm library. The surviving books were moved into the Kassel University Library.

=== documenta ===
In 1955, the first documenta exhibition, founded by Arnold Bode, took place in the provisionally restored Fridericianum building. Since then documenta has been held every five years in the Fridericianum, which was fully renovated by 1982.

== Exhibition hall ==
The Fridericianum began hosting its own temporary exhibitions as well in 1988, opening with Veit Loers' exhibition Schlaf der Vernunft (1988), which made reference to Fridericianum's original purpose, juxtaposing museum objects from the Enlightenment period with those of contemporary art.

In 1998, René Block took over from Loers as Artistic Director of the Fridericianum, focusing on the supposed peripheries of the global art world.

Following Block, the Fridericianum was directed from 2008 to 2011 by Rein Wolfs, who organized the first exhibition of Danh Vo's "We the People", for which the artist recast a life-size Statue of Liberty from 30 tons of copper sheets.

Since June 2013, Susanne Pfeffer has been director of the Fridericianum. Pfeffer presented an exhibition trilogy "Speculations on Anonymous Materials" (2013), "nature after nature" (2014) and "Inhuman" (2015). In 2015, she dedicated a large-scale retrospective to the American experimental filmmaker Paul Sharits. On the occasion of the 60th anniversary of documenta, Pfeffer organised a retrospective of the Belgian artist Marcel Broodthaers, featuring works from all of the artist's creative periods.
