= Stadtschloss Kassel =

Former city palace of Kassel, Germany

Coordinates: 51.3137°N 9.503°E

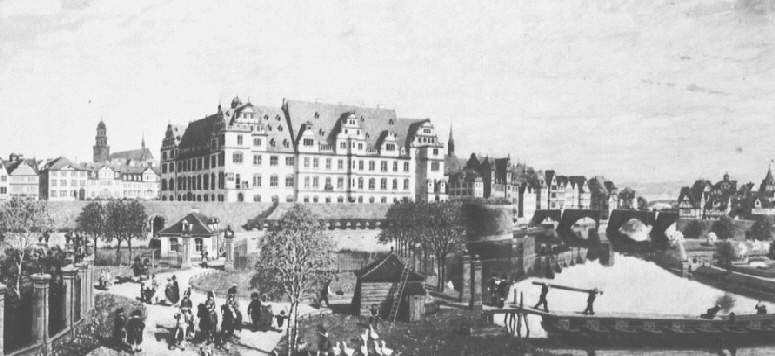
The Kassel City Palace seen from the Fulda River

Landgrafenschloss Kassel or Stadtschloss Kassel (English: Kassel City Palace) is a former palace in Kassel, Germany, which served as a residence of the Landgraves and later Electors of Hesse-Kassel. Also, the brother of Napoleon, Jérôme Bonaparte lived here shortly as the King of Westphalia. In 1811, the city palace was destroyed by a fire and not restored afterwards.

== Location ==
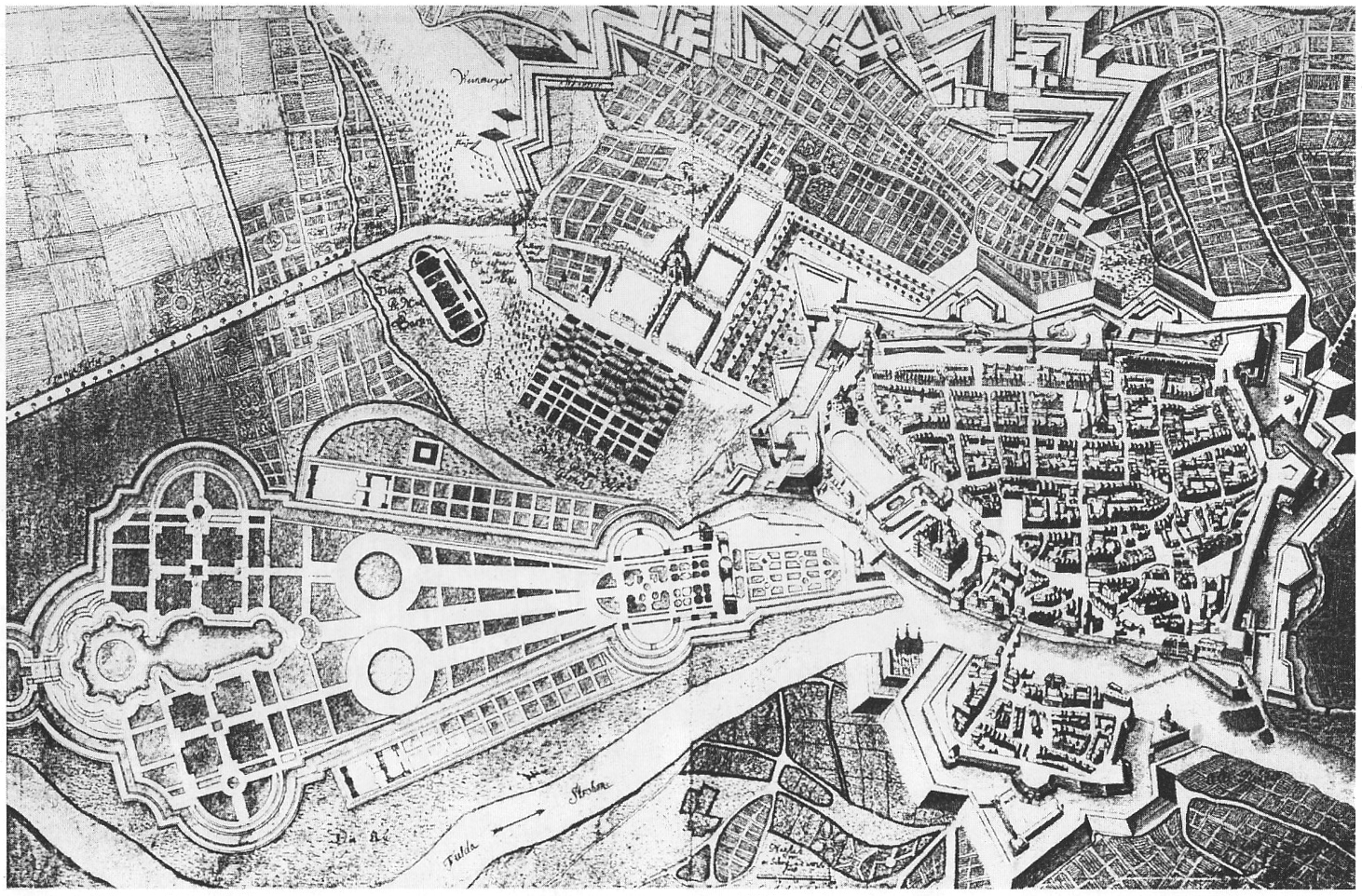
A city map of Kassel dating 1736 shows the city palace laying at the south side of the city, with to its left the Karlsaue park

The city palace was located at an elevation of 156 meters above sea level, at the site of the current regional government office (German: Regierungspräsidium) overlooking the Fulda river. Presumably, a Frankish royal court named Chassalla stood here already around the year 913.

== History ==
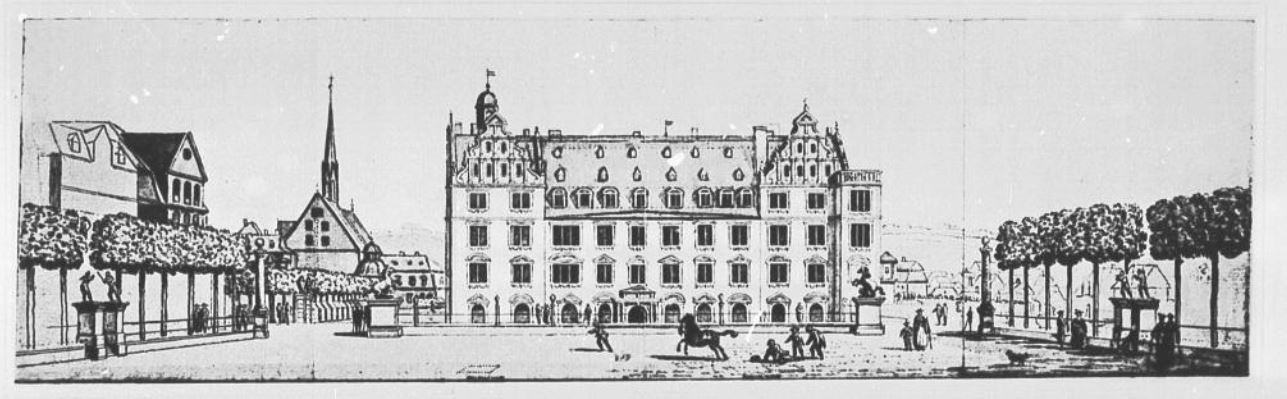
The Kassel City Palace seen from the South West

=== The First Castle of Henry I ===
At the site of the Frankish Royal Court (German: Königshof), the first castle was built by Henry I, Landgrave of Hesse in 1277 and later expanded by his successors. In 1935, foundations and cellar vaults from the 14th and 15th centuries were uncovered. Strategically located on the high banks of the Fulda River, the castle secured the vital river crossing for long-distance trade routes. The original structure was likely made mostly of wood, with a stone fortification added in 1386.

=== The Second Castle: The Ludwig Building ===
Between 1462 and 1466, Landgrave Louis II replaced the first castle by a new building: A rectangular, southwest-to-northeast-oriented structure arose, consisting of a two-story stone base and a one-story timber-framed upper floor. The castle included a manor house and several separate buildings surrounding an inner courtyard.

This so-called Ludwig Building was situated on the northwest side of the grounds, parallel to the old stone road. After a gunpowder explosion, it soon had to be renovated, and over the following years, it was continually expanded and improved.

Towards the end of the 15th century, the castle's fortifications were renewed. Starting in 1502, Landgrave William II had a larger extension built on the side facing the Fulda River, a wing made of red sandstone, which was called the "Rothenstein Wing" due to its red colour.

=== The Renaissance Castle ===
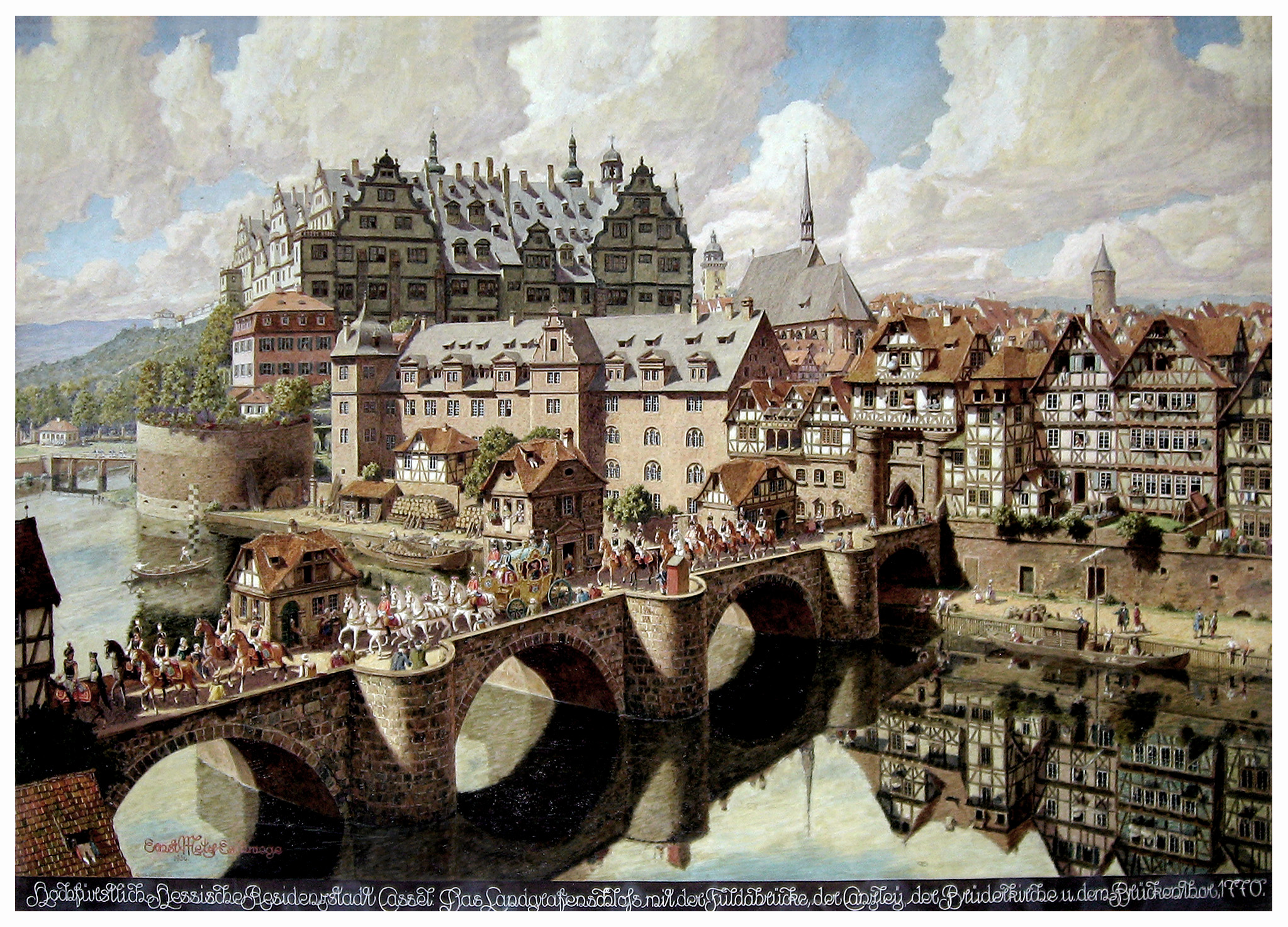
The Kassel City Palace, the lower city and the bridge over the Fulda river around 1770

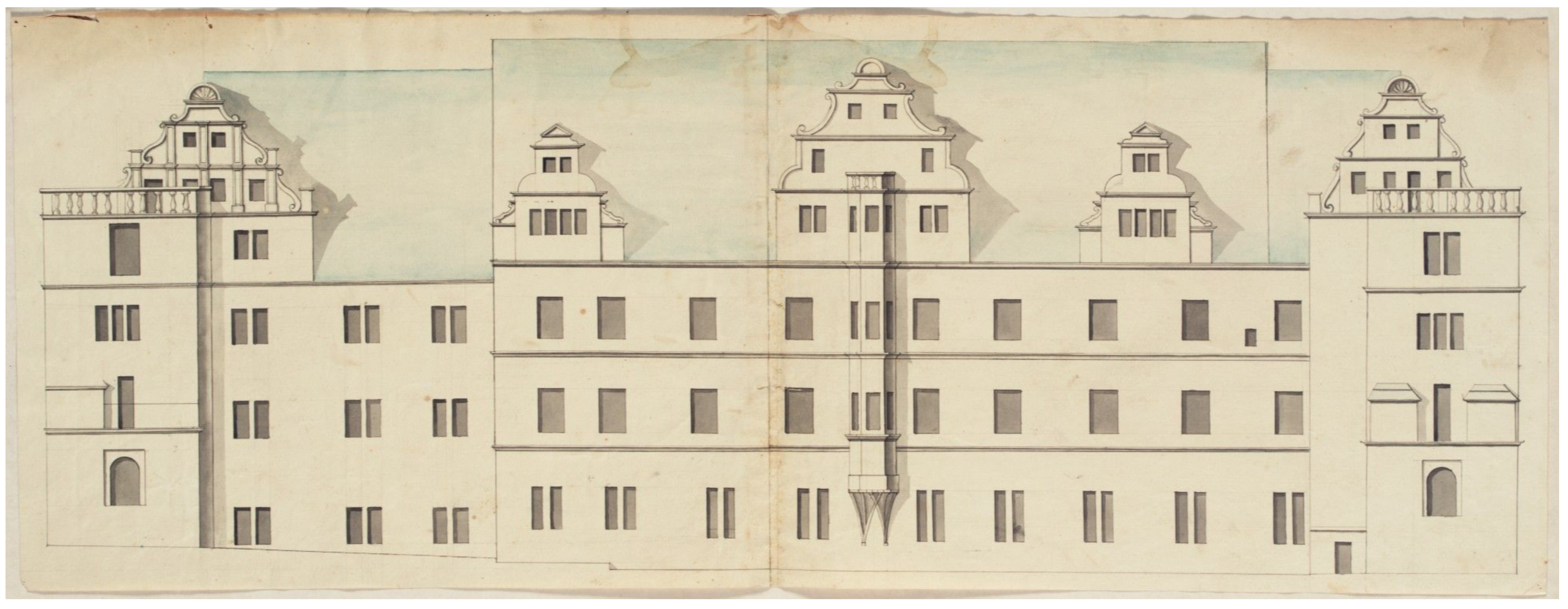
The façade facing the Fulda River

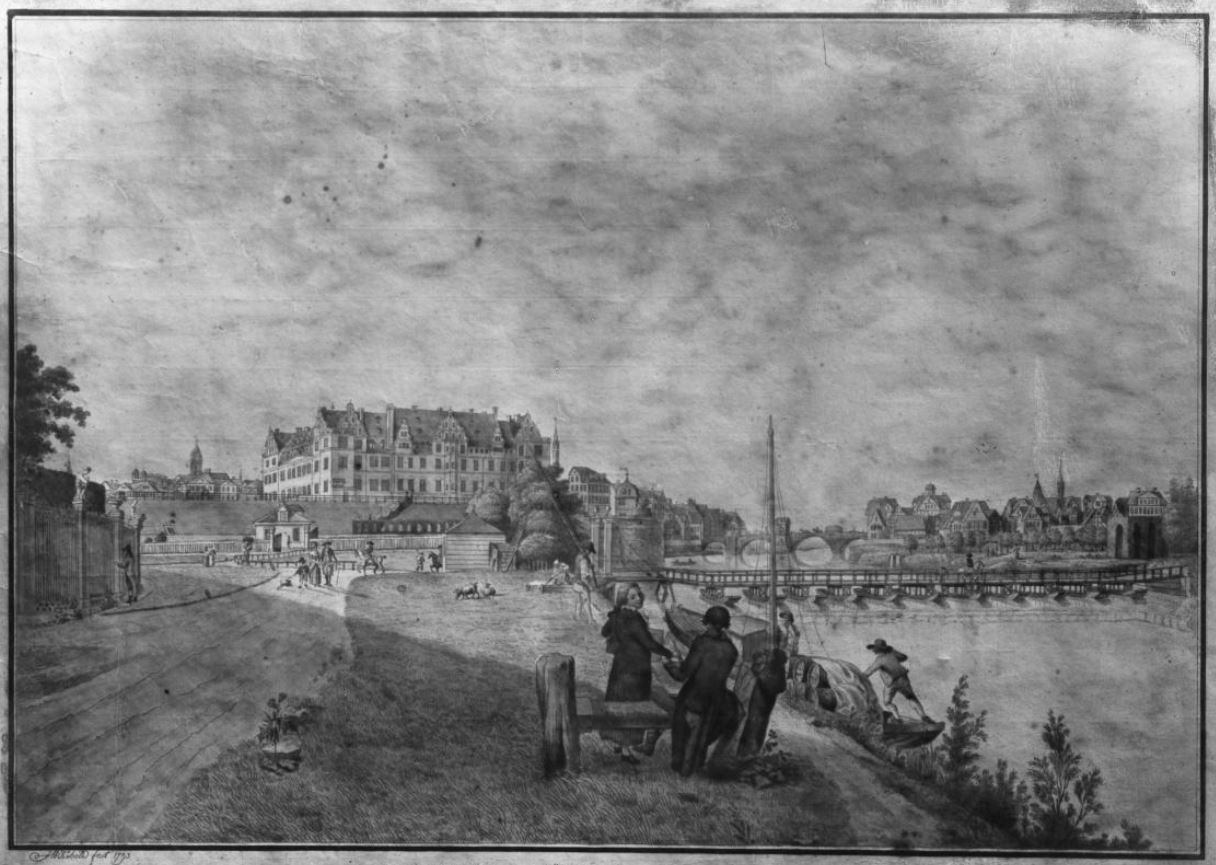
The Kassel City Palace seen from the Fulda River

In 1523, Landgrave Philip I started transforming the city of Kassel into a modern fortress. He eventually ordered the partial demolition of the old castle, which had been expanded multiple times. Between 1556 and 1562, using parts of the existing structure, fortress architect Antonius Riemenschneider constructed a Renaissance-style palace in its place.

Construction started in November 1556 with the kitchen building, which had a central entrance on the southwest side, followed by the adjacent city-facing bakery building in 1560. The women's quarters, located near the Brothers Church, were expanded between 1560 and 1562.

Philip's son, William IV, the first Landgrave of Hesse-Kassel, had the Gothic "Rothenstein Wing" renovated between 1570 and 1574. Court painters Caspar van der Borcht and Jost vom Hoff played key roles in decorating the interiors. William IV also established the first observatory in Central Europe at the palace, consisting of two balconies on the southern front with a balustrade walkway.

William IV's son, Landgrave Maurice, continued the transformation by renovating the chapel between the Rothenstein Wing and the women's quarters. The palace now became a three-story, four-wing structure with an almost square layout around a spacious courtyard, featuring a high roof with numerous dormer windows. Polygonal spiral stair towers stood at the corners of the courtyard.

The palace remained largely unchanged until the French invasion in December 1806, serving as the residence of the House of Hesse-Kassel. Although there were various plans in the 18th century to modernize the palace, such as a proposal by Charles de Wailly .

The last ruler of Hesse-Kassel to reside in the city palace was William I, who was elevated to Elector in 1803. He had to leave his land on 1 November 1806, shortly before it was occupied by France.

=== Destruction: the 1811 Fire ===
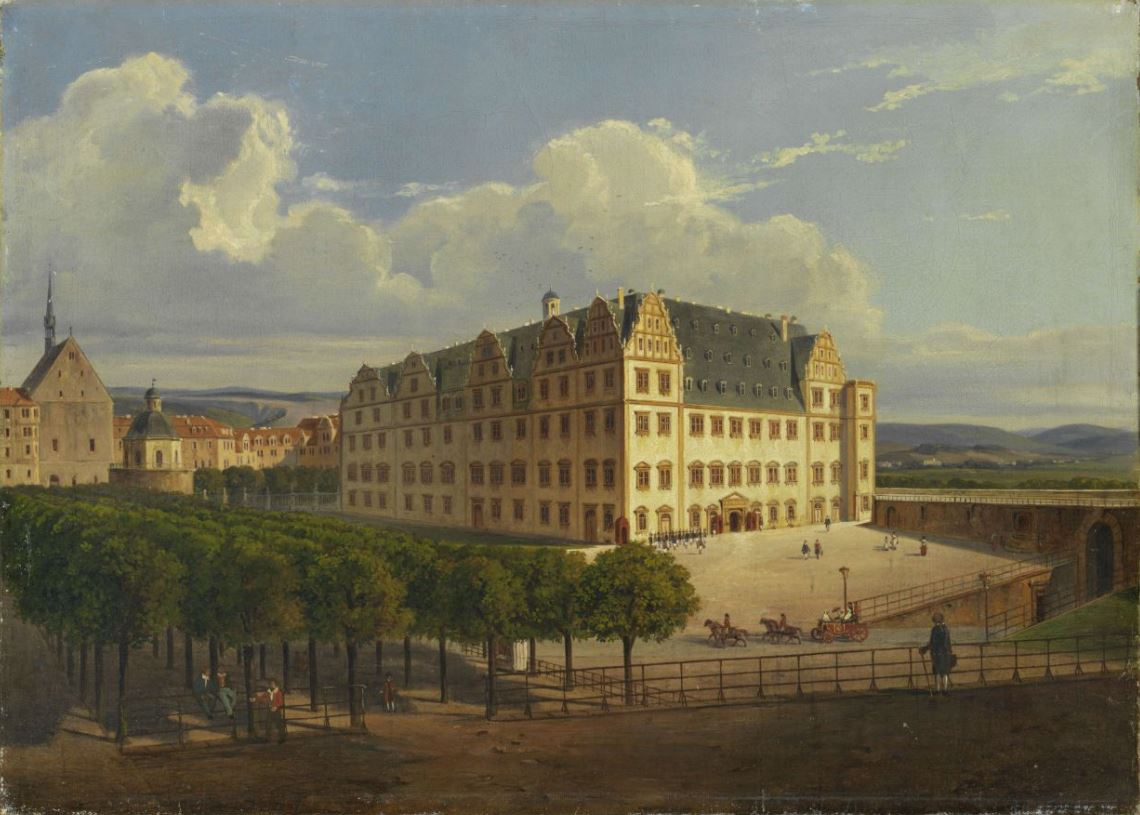
The Kassel City Palace around 1805

After the creation of the Kingdom of Westphalia by decree of Napoleon on 18 August 1807, the new king of Westphalia, Napoleon's brother Jérôme, moved into the Kassel City Palace on 10 December 1807.

On the night of Saturday to Sunday, 24 November 1811, flames suddenly broke out in the palace. Jérôme's court architect, Grandjean de Montigny, had removed many of the palace's stoves and replaced them with a heating system using copper pipes beneath the floors, similar to underfloor heating. The outside temperature that night was minus 20 degrees, and the heating was so intense that the pipes glowed. This ignited the wooden floors, starting in the wing facing the Fulda River.

Jérôme is said to have escaped his bedroom only half-dressed. Firefighting efforts were very difficult as the fire pumps froze. By morning, one-third of the palace, including the chapel, was completely destroyed. The fire had utterly consumed the northwestern wing.

The disaster was partially blamed on Jérôme's Grand Marshal (German: Hofmarschall), Pierre Simon Meyronnet, who had been made Count of Wellingerode by Jérôme. He had been repeatedly warned of a smell of smoke but dismissed concerns of fire as nonsense. Then the fire, which had been smoldering for days, broke out.

Jérôme, who was more focused on his pleasures and financially ruining his kingdom, moved to the Bellevue palace and showed no interest in rebuilding.

=== The End ===
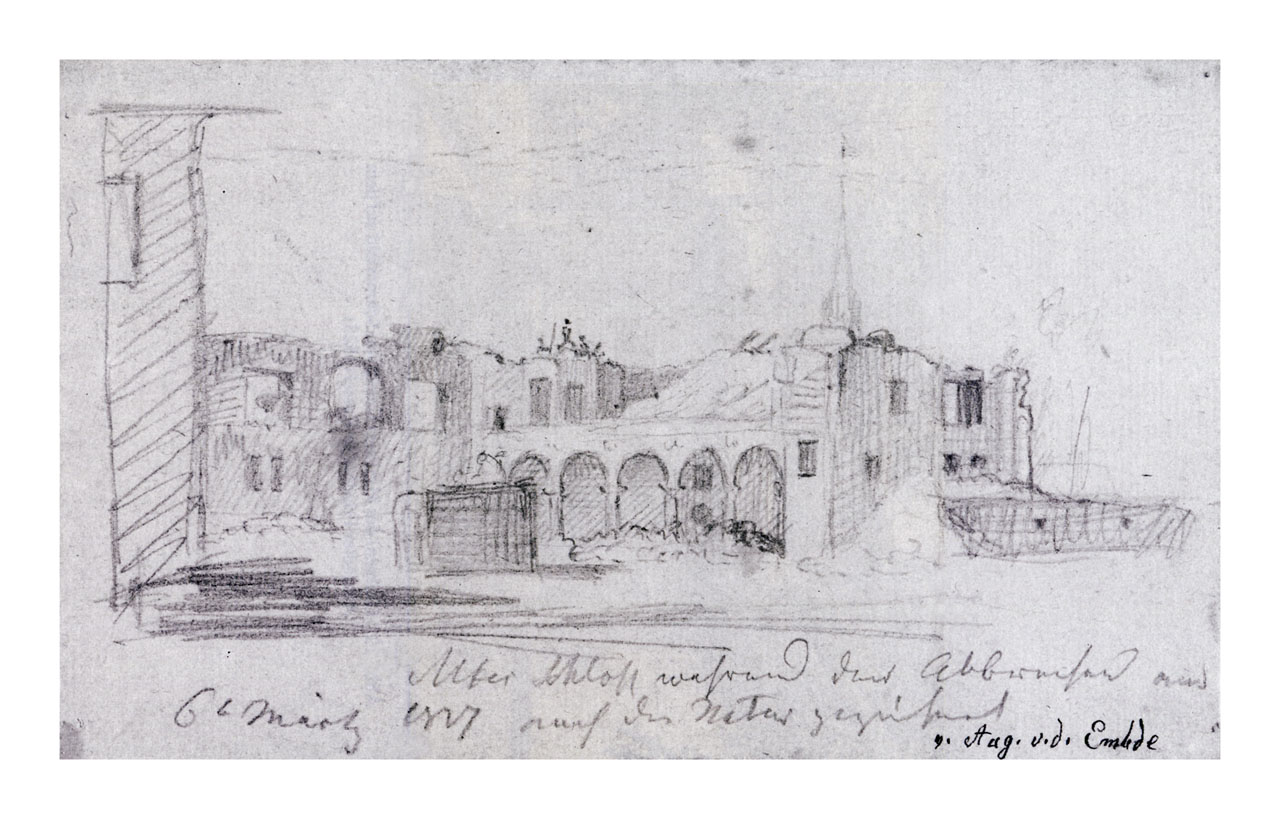
The Kassel City Palace in ruins

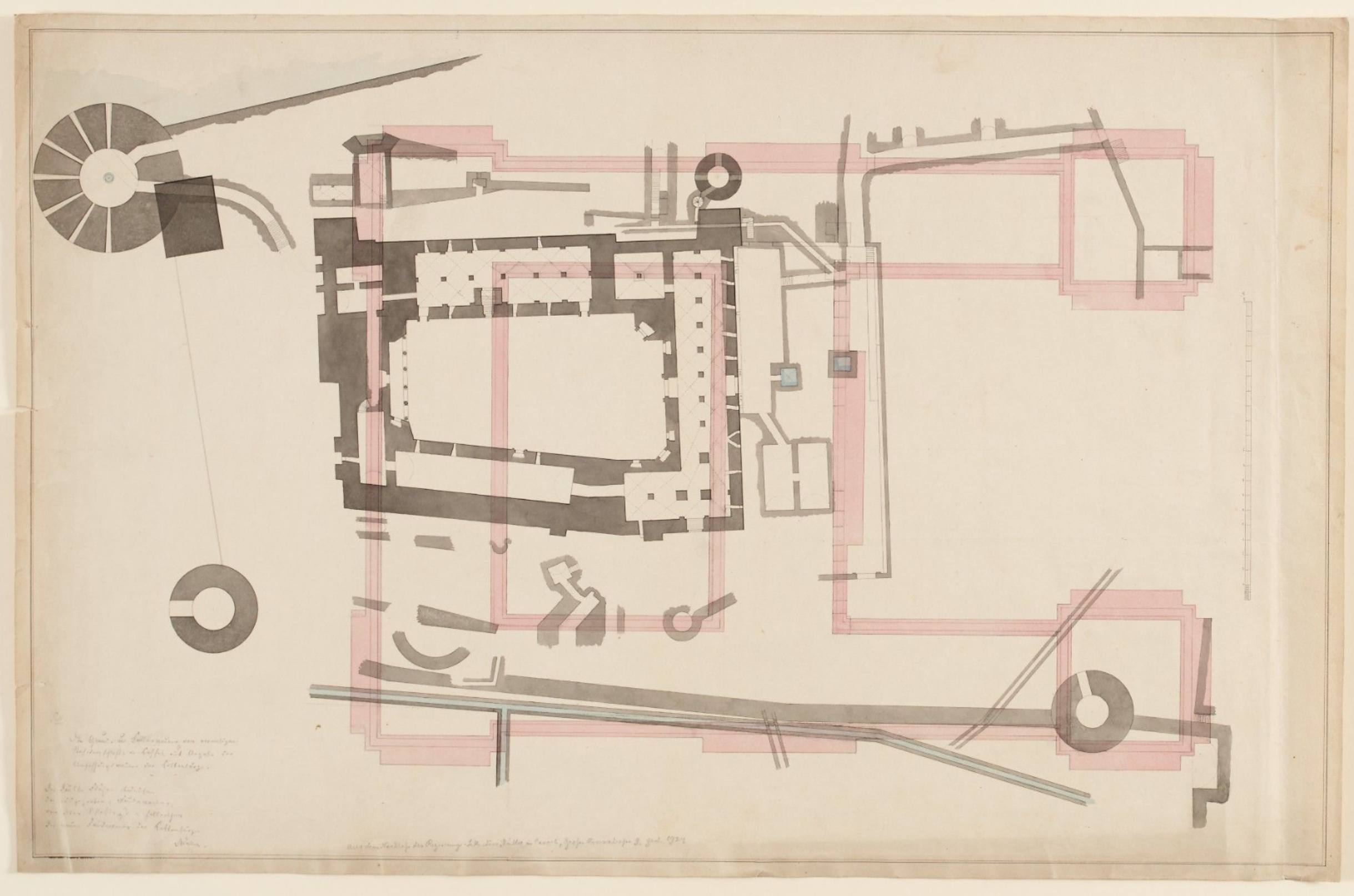
The foundations of the Kassel City Palace (presented in black) in relation to the Chattenburg palace (shown in red)

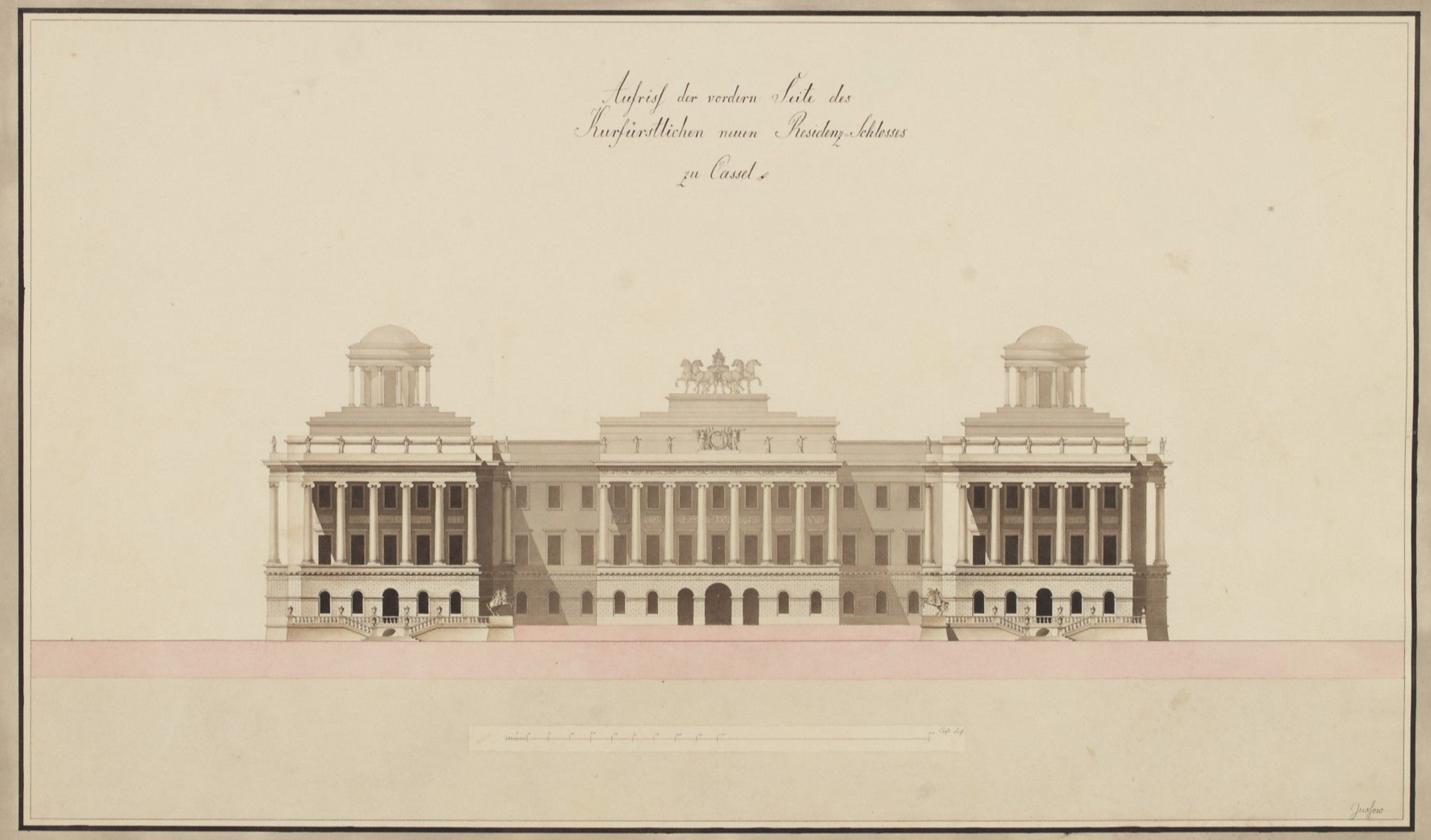
Design for the Chattenburg Palace by Jussow (1816 or 1817)

Elector William I returned to Kassel on 21 November 1813, after the French were expelled from Hesse in the Wars of Liberation. Having failed at the Congress of Vienna to be crowned "King of the Chatti", he at least wanted to build a palace worthy of a king.

In December 1816, he ordered the remains of the destroyed wing to be cleared away and the still standing but damaged three wings of the city palace to be demolished, to realize a grand new building plan. His architect, Heinrich Christoph Jussow, planned the "Chattenburg" palace. The scale and cost far exceeded the typical scope of a princely residence.

Lengthy foundation work began in June 1817, but it was not until June 27, 1820, that the foundation stone was ceremonially laid. When William I died on 27 February 1821, only the first floor of the shell was completed. The work on the neoclassical building was then abandoned, as his son and successor, Elector William II, preferred his princely palace on Friedrichsplatz, the Residenzpalais, and showed no interest in continuing the Chattenburg project. From 1840 to 1870, the red sandstone of the foundation was dismantled and used in the construction of the nearby New Gallery between 1871 and 1874.

== Subsequent Buildings ==
After the Prussian annexation of Hesse in 1866, the new Prussian administration was initially housed in the Hessen-Rotenburg Palace on Königsplatz from October 1867. However, the space there was too limited from the start, and soon the site of the former and unfinished Chattenburg was considered for the construction of a new government building. After the remaining ruins were completely removed in 1870, the government purchased the land, along with the still-existing foundations and cellars, from the General Administration of the Electorate's Family Trust and began constructing a new monumental government and justice building in 1875, in the style of the Gründerzeit era. After seven years of construction, it was completed in 1882, and even at the time, contemporaries described it as an "oversized brick box".

The building was heavily damaged during the devastating air raid on Kassel on 22 October 1943. The ruins were removed between 1949 and 1953. From 1957 to 1960, the current office tower of the regional government was built on the same site.

== Literature ==
- Heppe, Dorothea (1995). Das Schloss der Landgrafen von Hessen in Kassel von 1557 bis 1811 (= Materialien zur Kunst- und Kulturgeschichte in Nord- und Westdeutschland. Band 17) (in German). Marburg: Jonas Verlag. ISBN 3-89445-183-1.
- 150 Regierungspräsidium Kassel (PDF) (in German). Kassel. 2022.
- Grossmann, G. Ulrich (2010). Renaissanceschlösser in Hessen Architektur zwischen Reformation und Dreissigjarigem Krieg (in German). Regensburg: Schnell und Steiner. ISBN 978-3-7954-2168-7.

== Gallery: 1774 Floor Plans of the Kassel City Palace ==
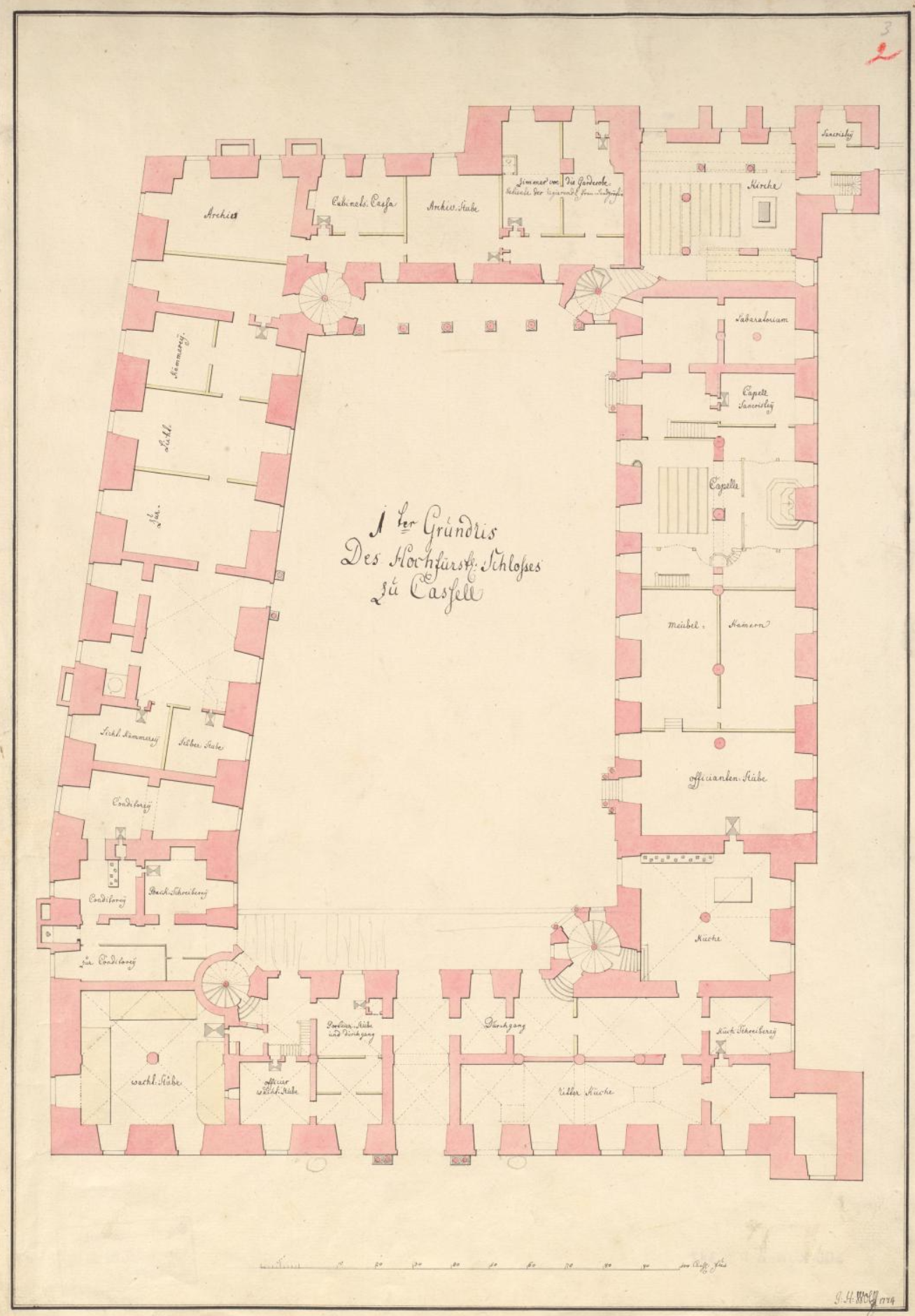
Ground Floor

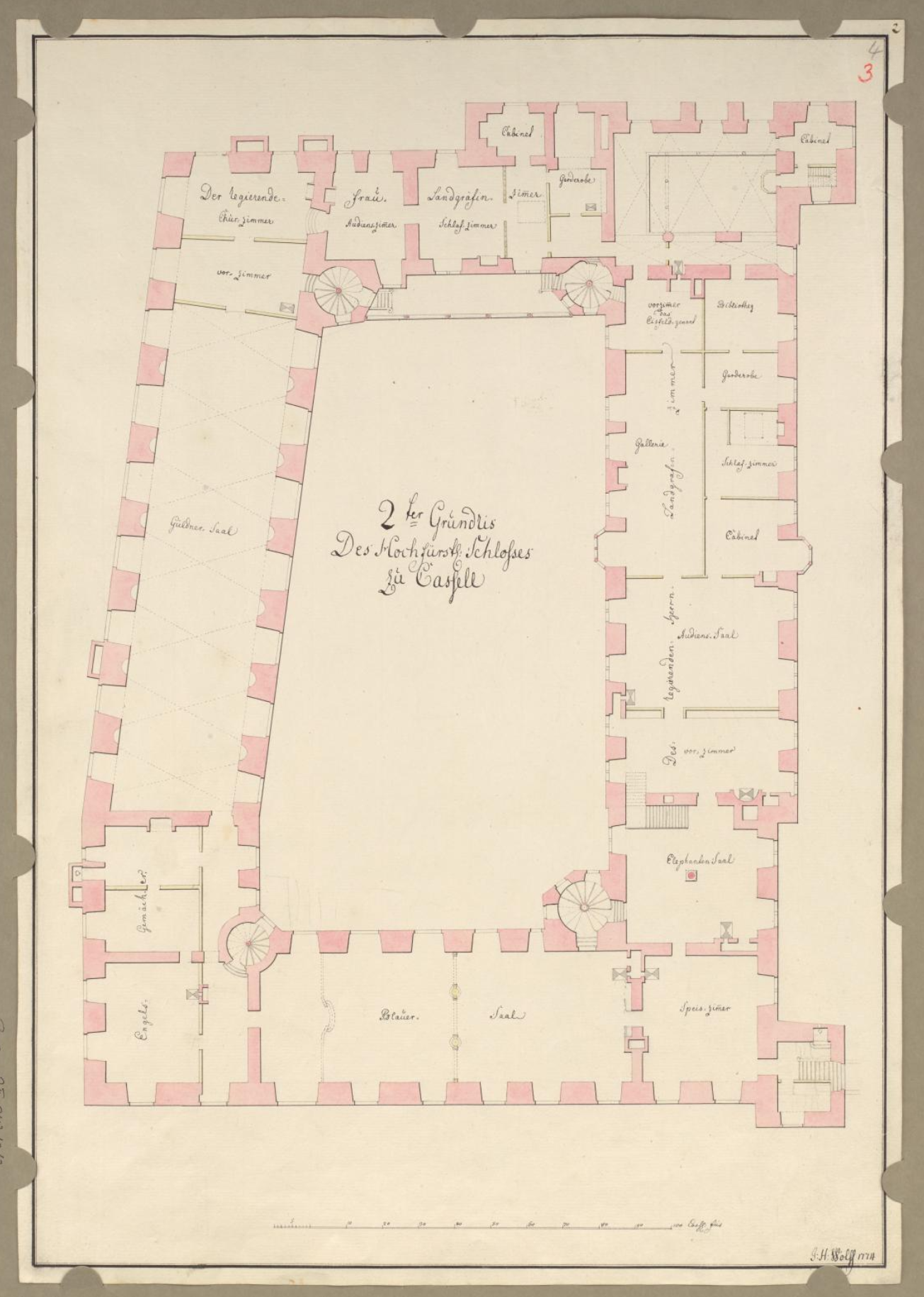
First Floor

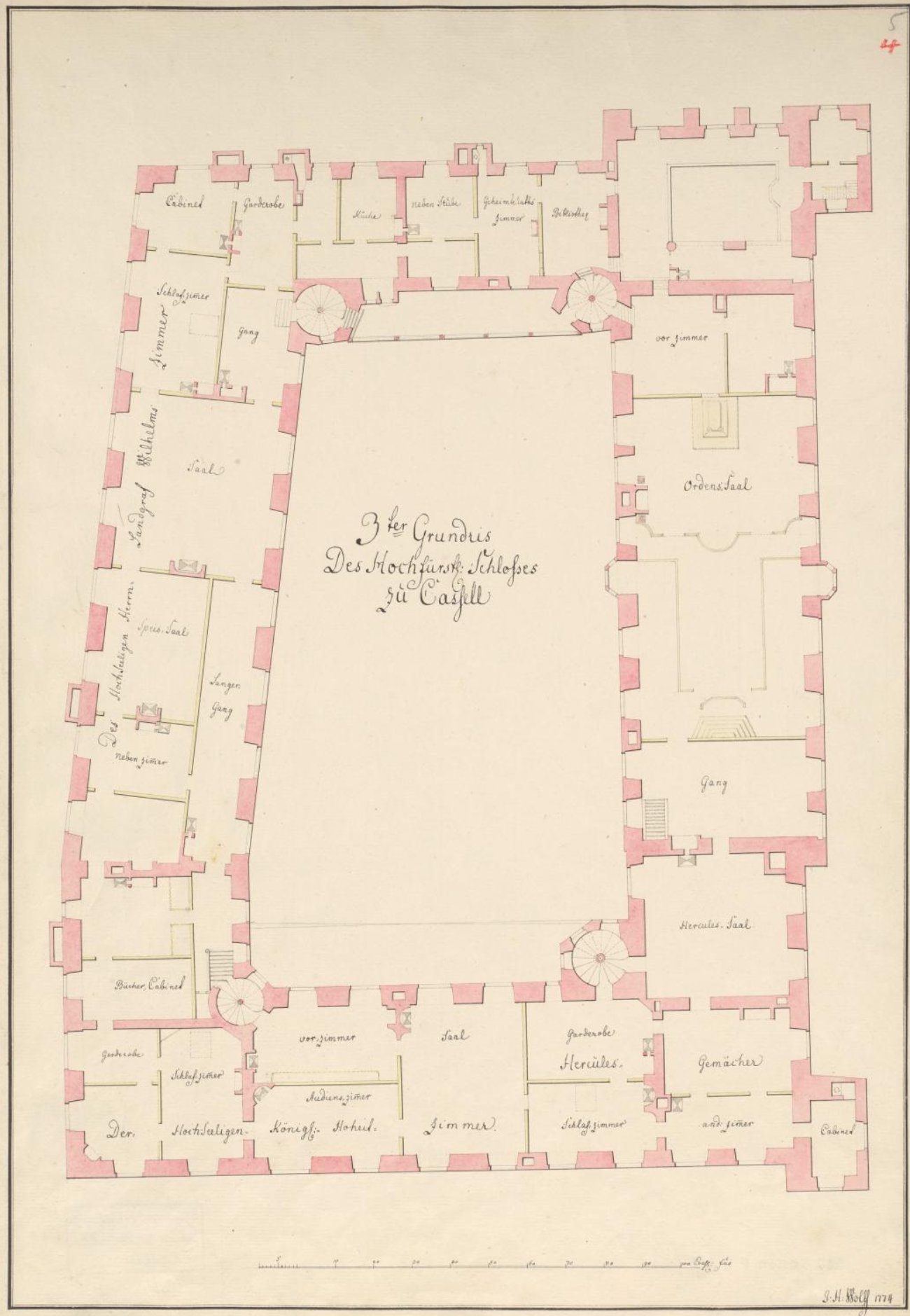
Second Floor

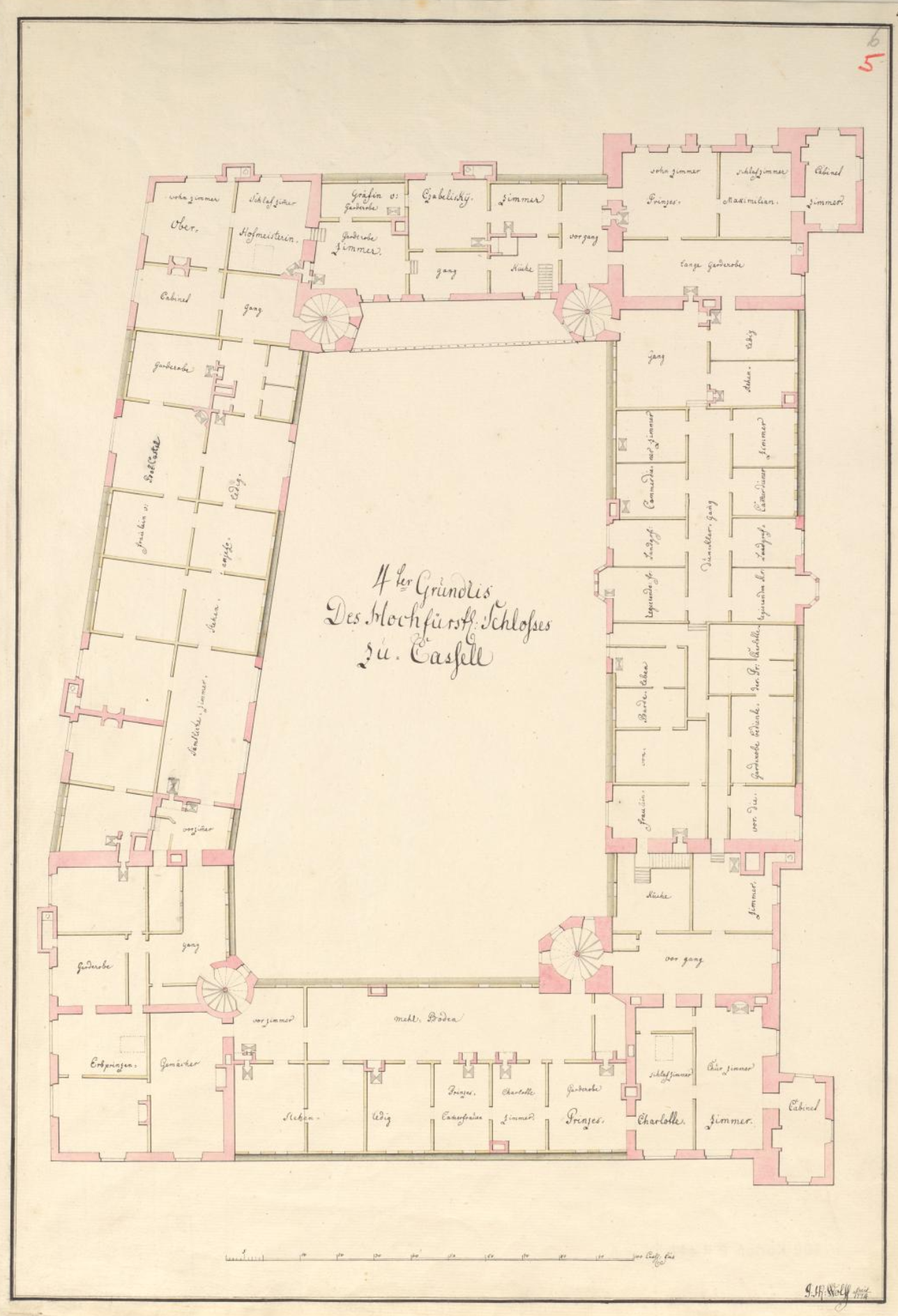
Third Floor
