= Residenzpalais (Kassel) =

Former palace in Kassel, Germany

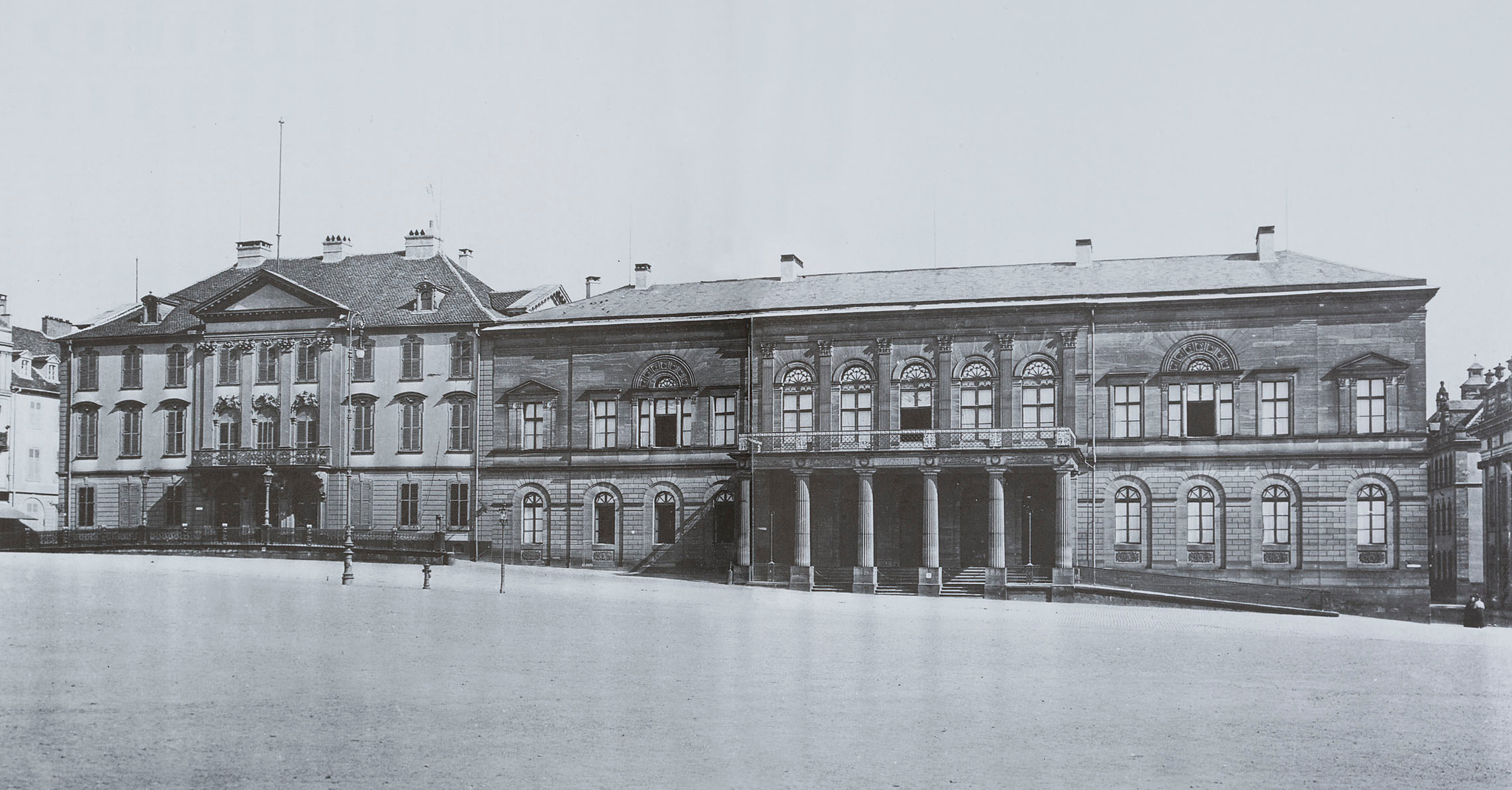
The Residenzpalais in Kassel – On the left the White palace, and on the right the Red palace

The Residenzpalais was a palace in Kassel, Germany, which served as the main residence of the Electors of Hesse-Kassel, and later the Prussian Monarchs. It was located on the Friedrichsplatz. After the abolition of the monarchy in 1918, it served as the municipal art gallery. During the Second World War, it was heavily damaged during Allied bombing raids. After the war, the palace was not restored, but its remains were demolished in 1961. It has been replaced by a department store designed by Sep Ruf. Today nothing remains except the portico.

== History ==
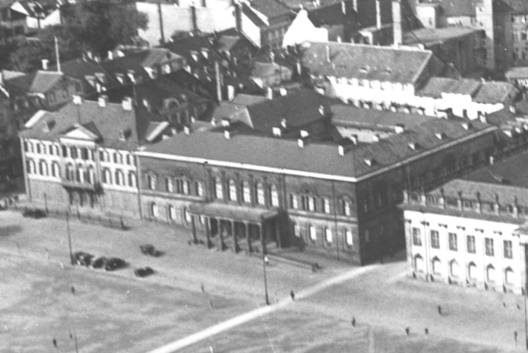
The Residenzpalais in Kassel from the air

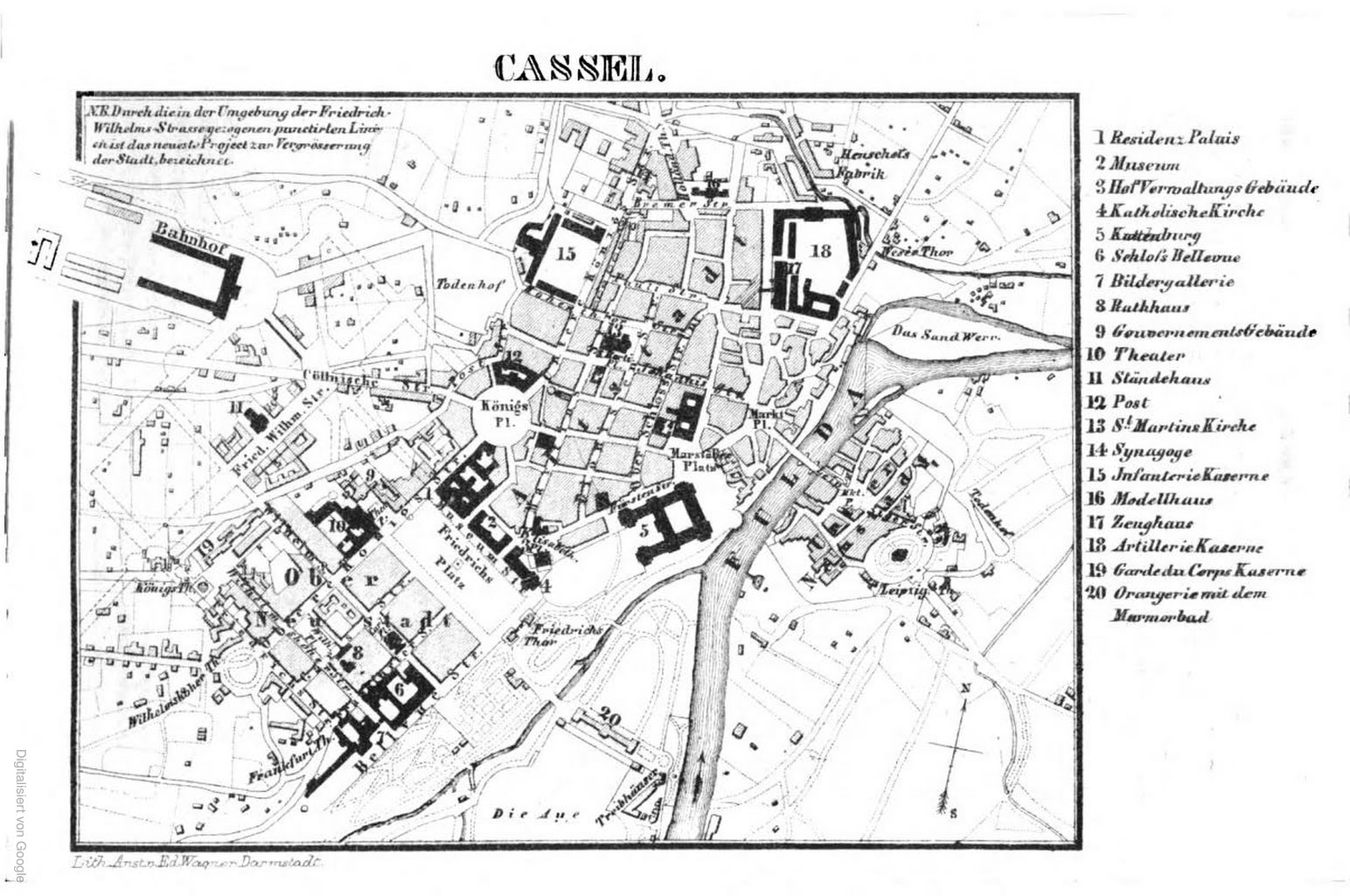
A map of Kassel in 1860: Number 1 represents the Residenzpalais, number 2 is the Chattenburg, and number 6 is Schloss Bellevue

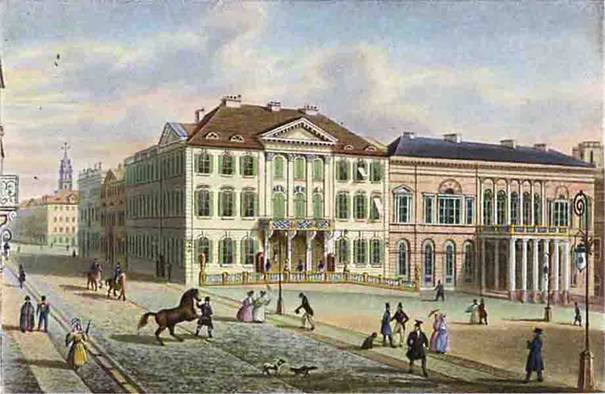
The Residenzpalais; the White and the Red palace

During the Napoleonic area, the Electorate of Hesse became part of the Kingdom of Westphalia with Napoleon's brother, Jérôme Bonaparte, as king. Kassel served as the capital. After the Kassel City Palace (German: Stadtschloss Kassel or German: Landgrafenschloss) burned down in 1811, Jérôme relocated to Schloss Bellevue. Following Jérôme's expulsion and the restoration of the Electorate in 1813, the Electoral court used various palaces in Kassel while planning and constructing a new city palace, the Chattenburg. This palace, had it been completed, would have been one of the largest neoclassical palaces in Germany. Among the buildings used by the court was the Residenzpalais, located at the corner of the Friedrichsplatz and the Oberen Königsstraße. The complex consisted of three buildings:

- The White palace (German: Weißes Palais) containing the private apartments of the Elector;
- The Red palace (German: Rotes Palais) containing the state rooms; and
- The Reichenbach palace (also called Palais Hanau or Kleines Palais (German: Small Palace)), until 1881 when it was sold.

=== White Palace ===
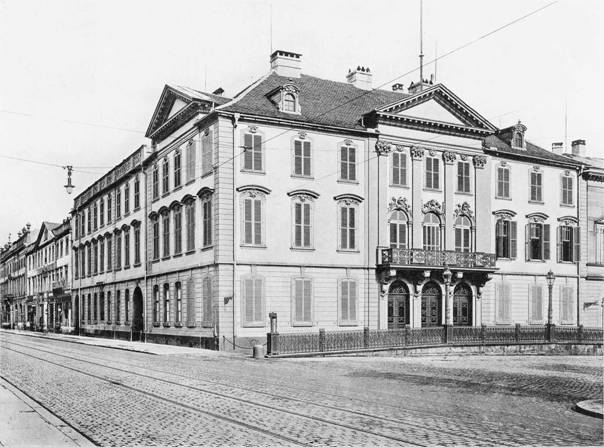
The White palace with in the back, the Reichenbach palace

The White palace was built by Simon Louis du Ry for general von Jungken between 1767 and 1769. In 1772, it was acquired by the Landstände of Hesse. After the Electorate was restored, the palace was given to Crown Prince William, the future Elector William II, to serve as his residence. With the help of the architect Johan Konrad Bromeis the palace was modernized.

=== Red Palace ===
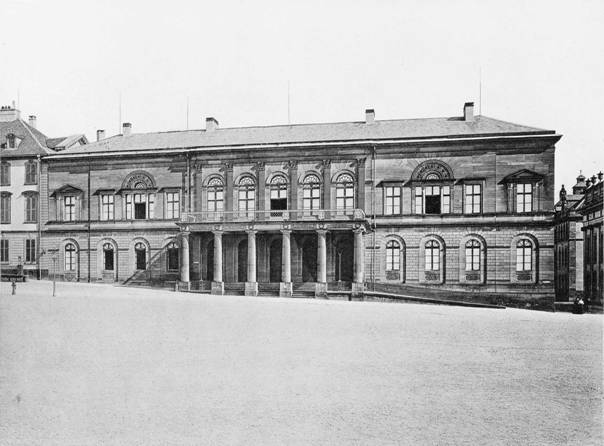
The Red palace

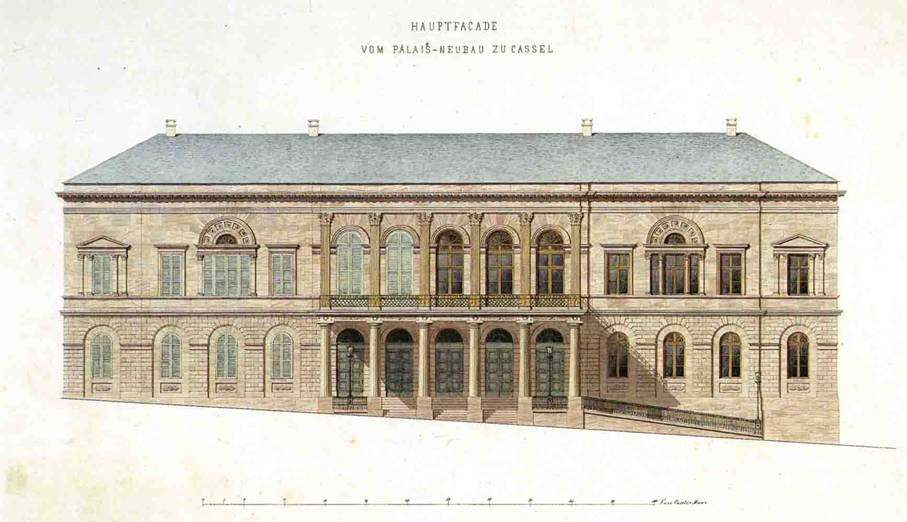
The Red palace

When Crown Prince William succeeded as Elector of Hesse after his father's dead in 1821, he halted the construction of the Chattenburg palace due to its high costs. However, he needing space for formal purposes, he commissioned the construction of the Red palace next to the White palace, connecting the two.

The Red palace was constructed between 1821 and 1826 based on a design by Bromeis, and was considered his master work. Its interior, designed in Empire style, was created with help of Daniel Engelhard and Julius Eugen Ruhl, with the finishing touches completed by 1837. It was one of the best examples in Empire style in Germany. It was also characterized by particular effective colour combinations.

The façade was made of red sandstone, with individual elements made of lighter yellowish sandstone. The old palace was painted in a white-greenish-gray color. Therefore, the names of the palaces.

=== 1866 – 1918: Prussian Royal Residence ===
After the annexation of the Electorate of Hesse by Prussia in 1866, the Residenzpalais was used by the Prussian monarchs, who frequently stayed at nearby Wilhelmshöhe Palace.

=== 1918 and beyond: After the abolition of the monarchy ===
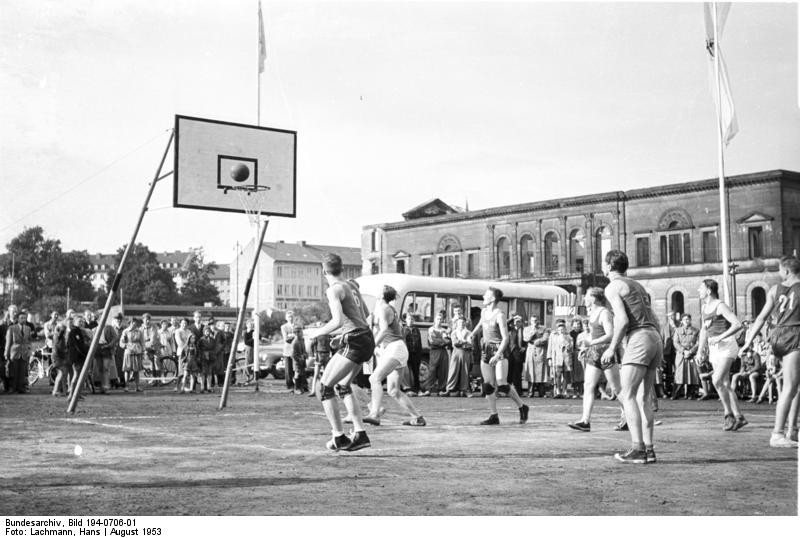
The ruins of the Red palace in 1953, which easily could have been restored

After the abolition of the monarchy, the palace became state property. The palace was repurposed as the German carpet museum, open to the general public.

During the Allied bombing raids on the night of August 27–28, 1942, both palace buildings were severely damaged, burning down to their masonry. Only the relocated furniture was saved. The remains of the White palace were gradually removed until 1950. While safety work on the Red Palace continued until 1953. However, neither the Hessian state government nor the Kassel city administration showed interest in preserving the building. Despite the fact that the palace ruins could have been restored, they were demolished in 1961. The site was sold, and a department store, designed by Sep Ruf, was built in its place. It The store housed "Bilka," short for Billig Kaufhaus English: cheap department store.

== Modern times ==
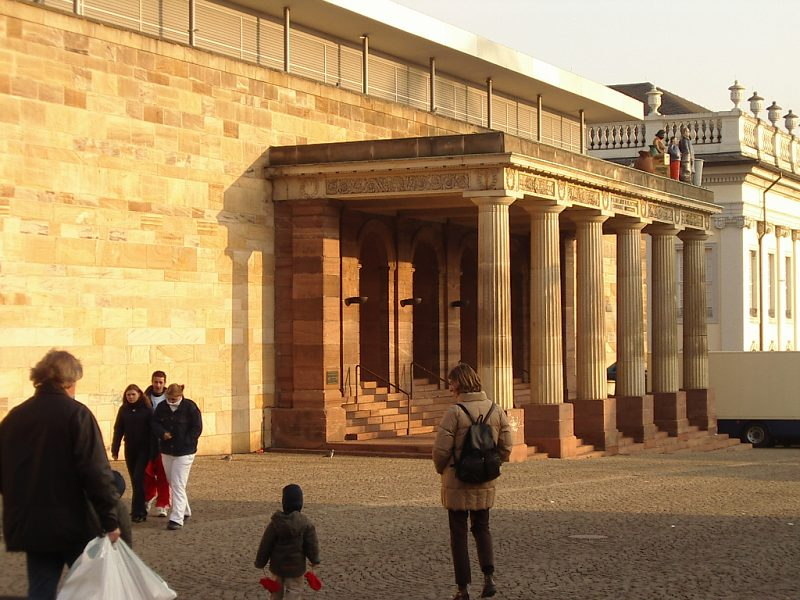
The portico of the Red palace is what remains of the Residenzpalais

Today, only the portico of the Red Palace remains as a reminder of its past.

The valuable furniture from the Red Palace was partially saved during the fire in 1941, and the entire collection from the White Palace was relocated. Some of these high-quality examples of Hessian craftsmanship are on display in the Weissenstein wing of Wilhelmshöhe Palace. However, the majority remains stored in depots, hidden from public view. Some pieces are on loan to the Schloss Bellevue in Berlin, the official residence of the president of Germany, and the New Palace in Potsdam, while the throne carpet, featuring the coat of arms of the Electorate of Hesse, is housed in Schloss Fasanerie near Fulda.

Remnants of the dismantled ramp railing from the White Palace are kept in the storerooms of the Hessian State Museum in Kassel. Additionally, according to local tradition, the front door of a house on Niederkaufunger Kirchplatz is said to have originated from the Residenzpalais.

== Literature ==
- Holtmeyer, Alois (1923). Die Bau- und Kunstdenkmäler im Regierungsbezirk Kassel, Bd. VI (in German). Marburg.
- Ruth, Hans (1930). Das Residenzpalais in Kassel. (Amtlicher Führer, Hg. Verwaltung der Staatlichen Schlösser und Gärten) (in German). Berlin: Deutscher Verlag.
- Heidelbach, Paul (1957). Kassel. Ein Jahrtausend hessischer Stadtkultur (in German). Kassel/ Basel: Bärenreiter-Verlag.
- Metz, Ernst Christopher (1980). Residenzstadt Cassel. Einführung von Gerhard Seib und Angelika Nold (in German). Kassel.
- Kretschmer, Frauke, ed. (1988). Kriegsschicksale Deutscher Architektur Verluste - Schäden - Wiederaufbau Eine Dokumentation für das Gebiet der Bundesrepublik Deutschland Band II: Süd (in German). Neumünster: Karl Wachtholz Verlag. pp. 866–867. ISBN 3-926642-22-X.
- Bidlingmaier, Rolf (2000). Das Residenzpalais in Kassel. Der Architekt J. Conrad Bromeis und die Raumkunst des Klassizismus und Empire in Kurhessen unter Kurfürst Wilhelm II (in German). München/ Zürich: Schnell und Steiner. ISBN 3-7954-1340-0.

== Gallery: Floor plans of the Residenzpalais (Holtmeyer, 1923) ==
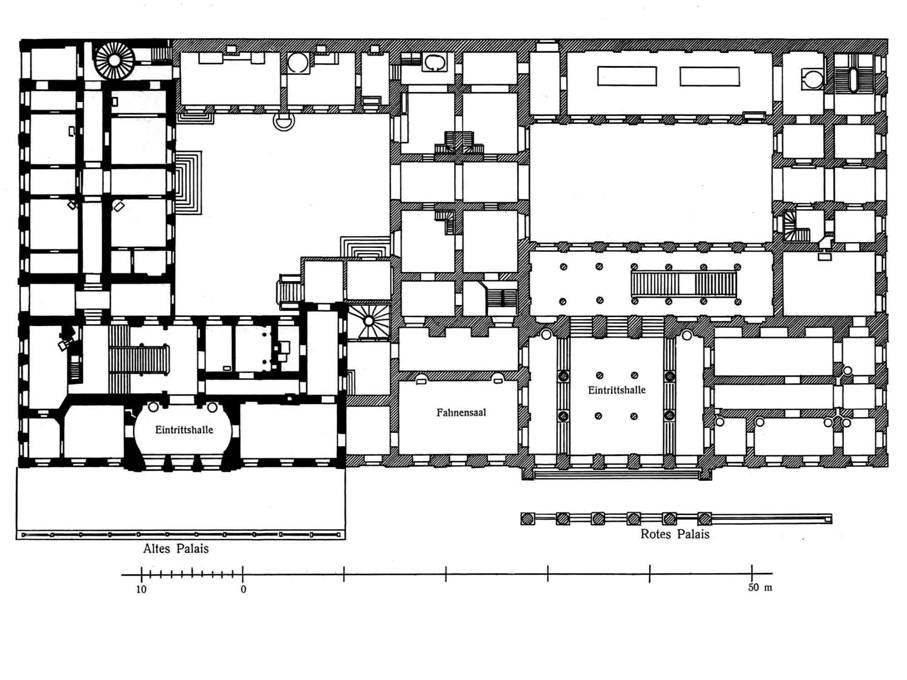
Residenzpalais ground floor

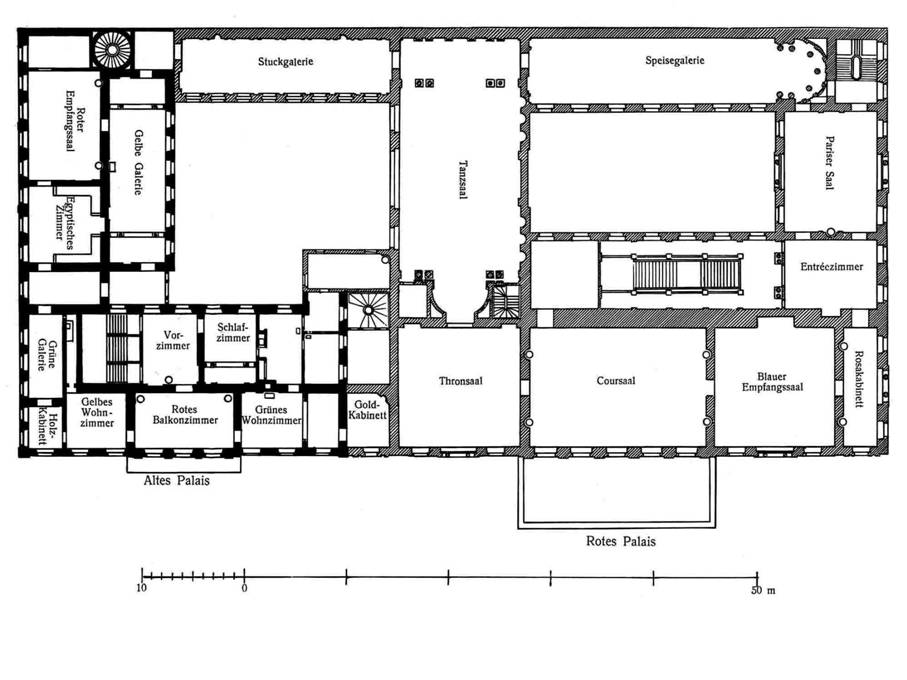
Residenzpalais first floor

=== Gallery: Interior of the Red Palace ===
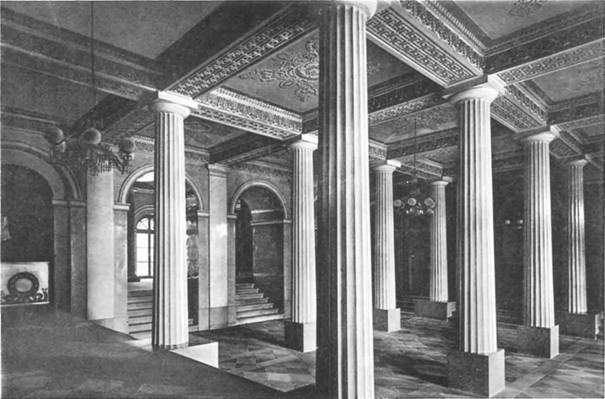
The entrance

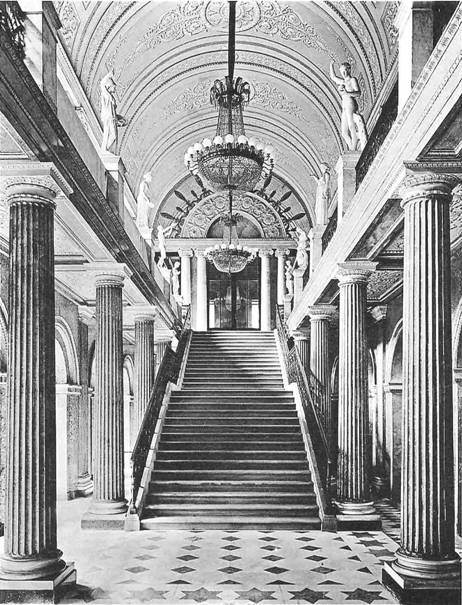
The staircase

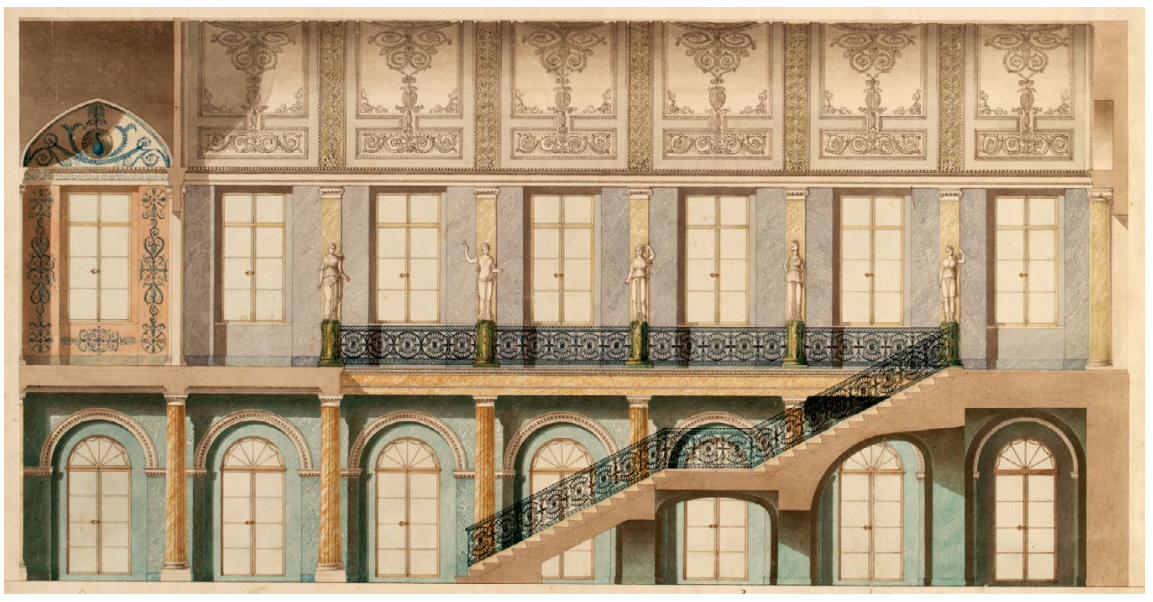
Design for the staircase

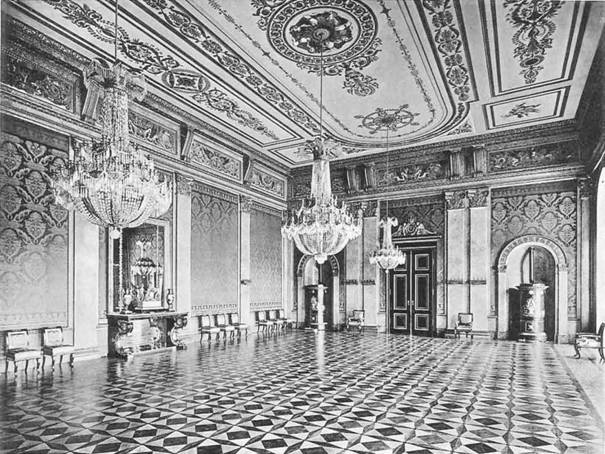
The blue reception hall

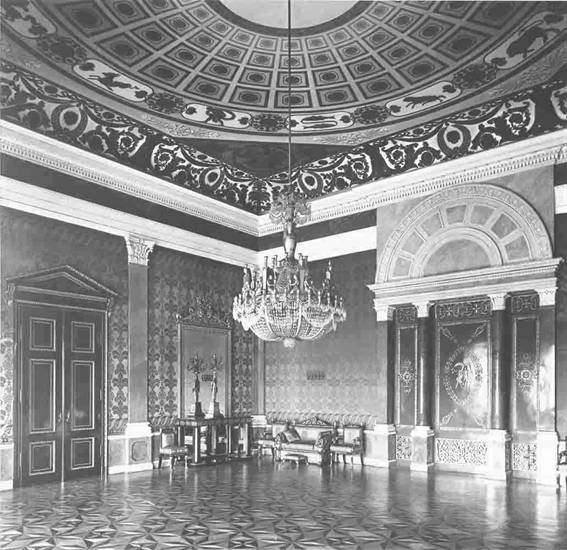
The green reception hall

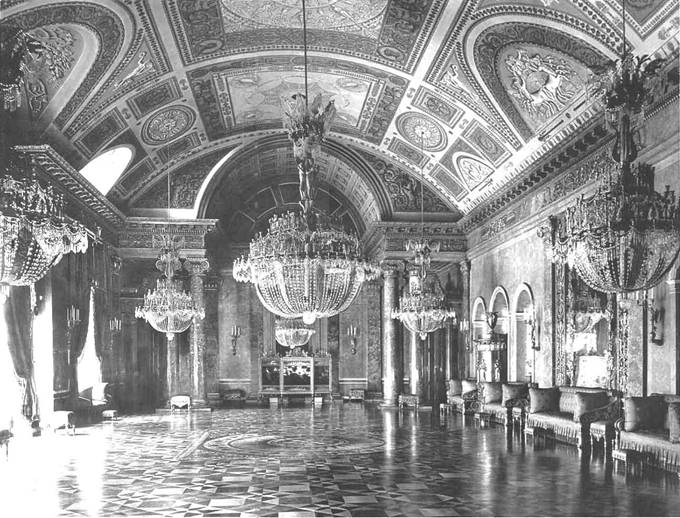
The banquet hall

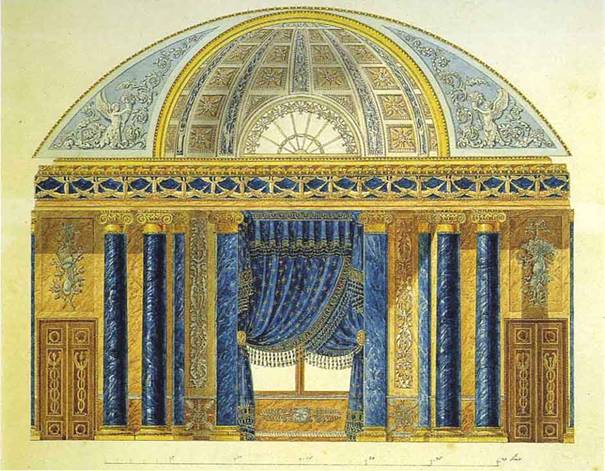
The banquet hall

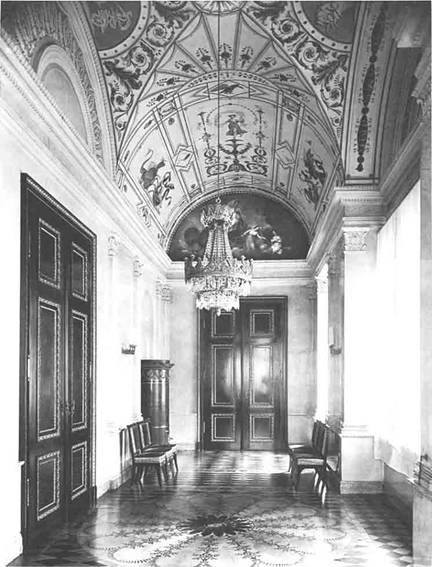
The small gallery

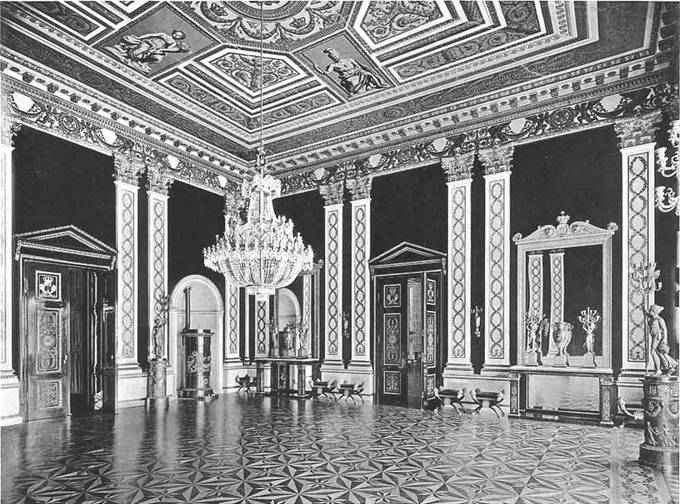
The throne hall

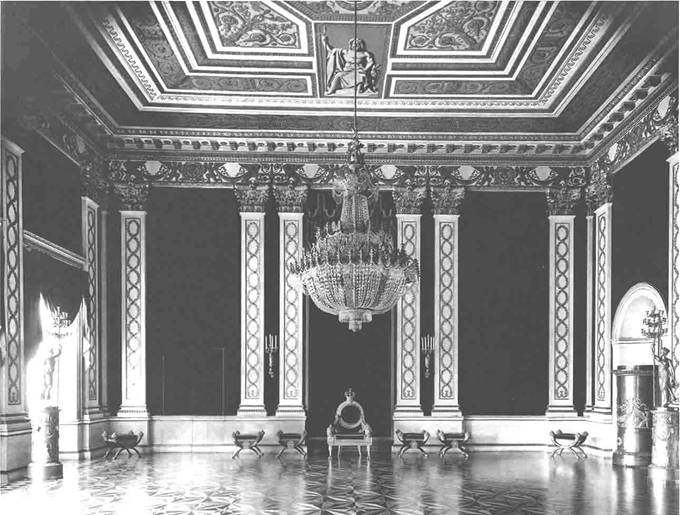
The throne hall
