= Chattenburg =

Former palace in Kassel, Germany

Coordinates: 51.3137°N 9.503°E

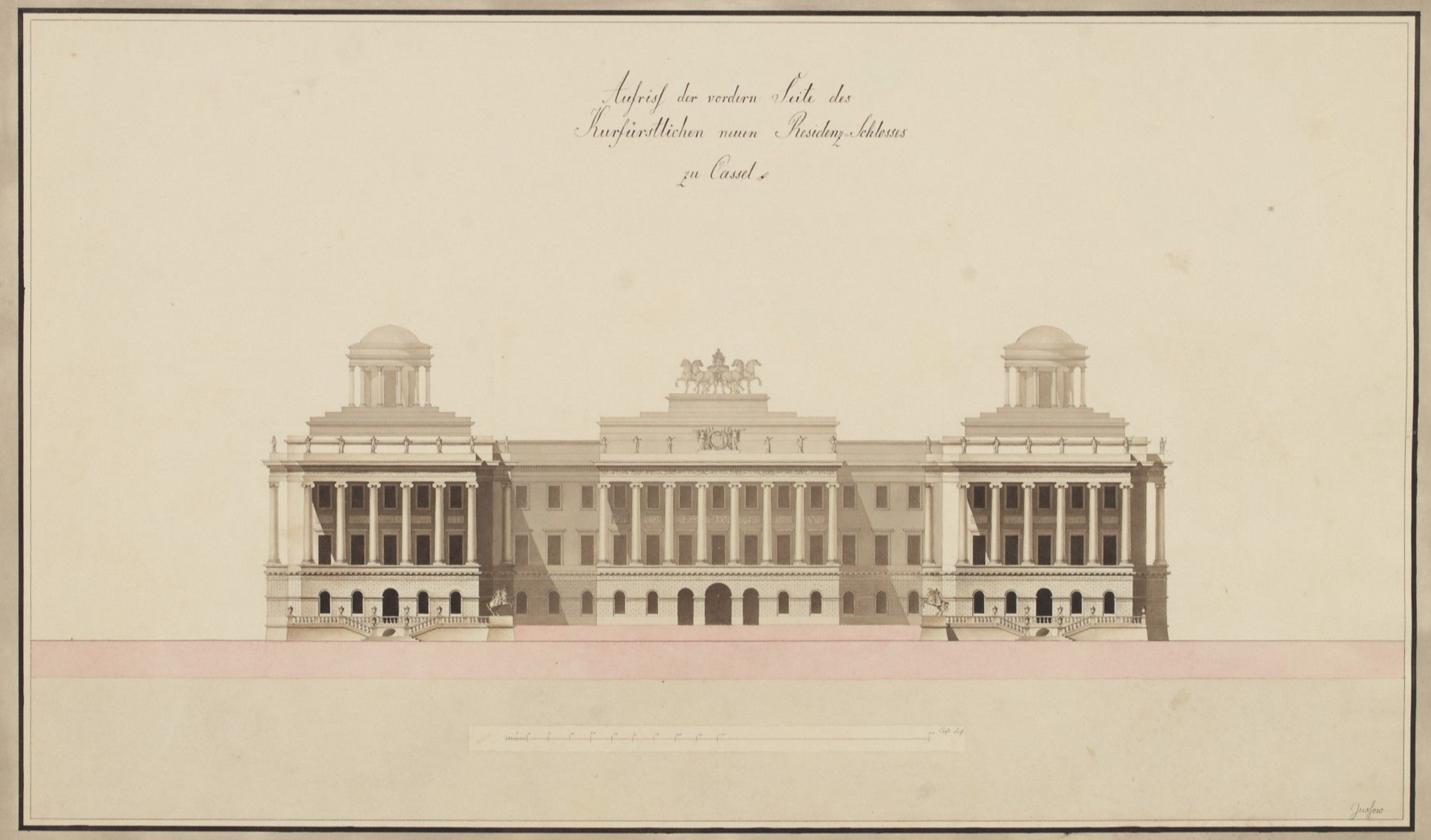
Chattenburg Palace – Courtyard design by Jussow (1816 or 1817)

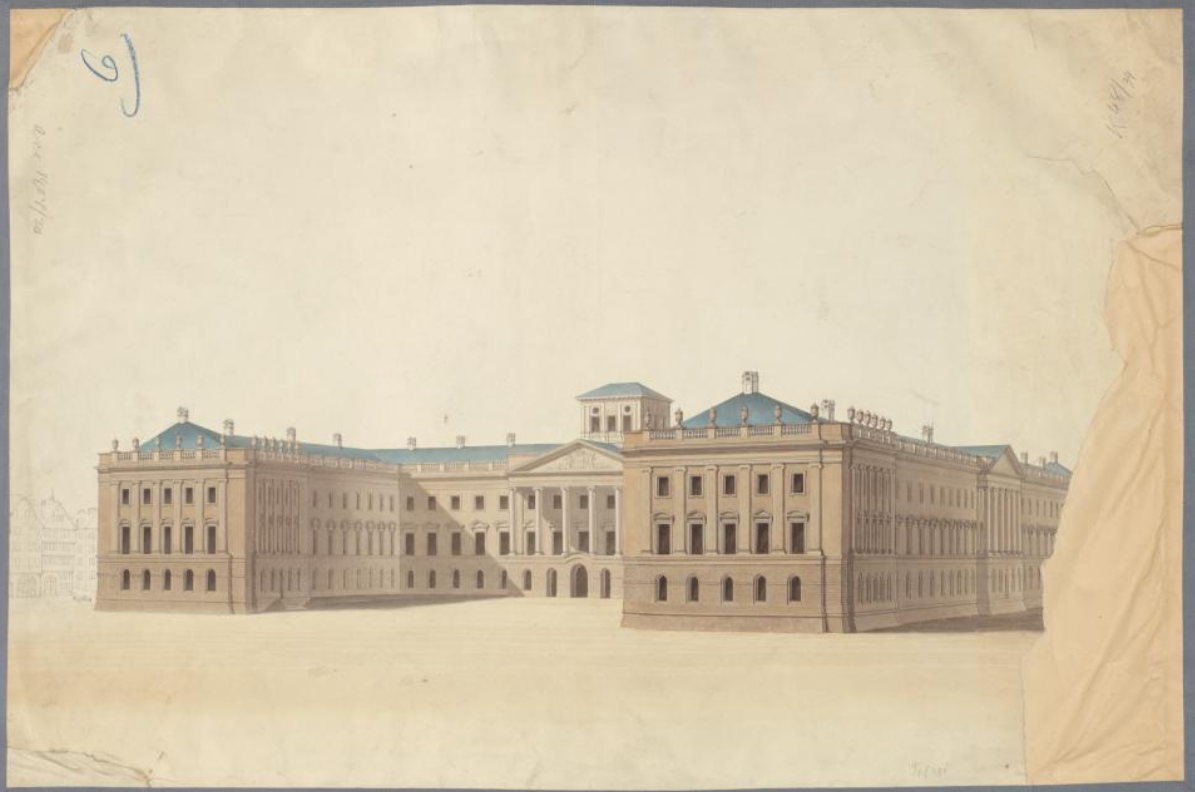
Chattenburg Palace - Simplified design proposal to restart construction by Julius Eugen Ruhl (1832)

The Chattenburg (also formerly known as Kattenburg) was a monumental residential palace in Kassel, Germany, started by Elector William I of Hesse. It was intended to replace the Kassel City Palace, which had been largely destroyed by a major fire in 1811 and demolished in 1816. The neoclassical palace was by the architect Heinrich Christoph Jussow. When William I died in February 1821, only the ground floor was completed in its raw structure, and his son and successor William II halted construction.

== Location ==
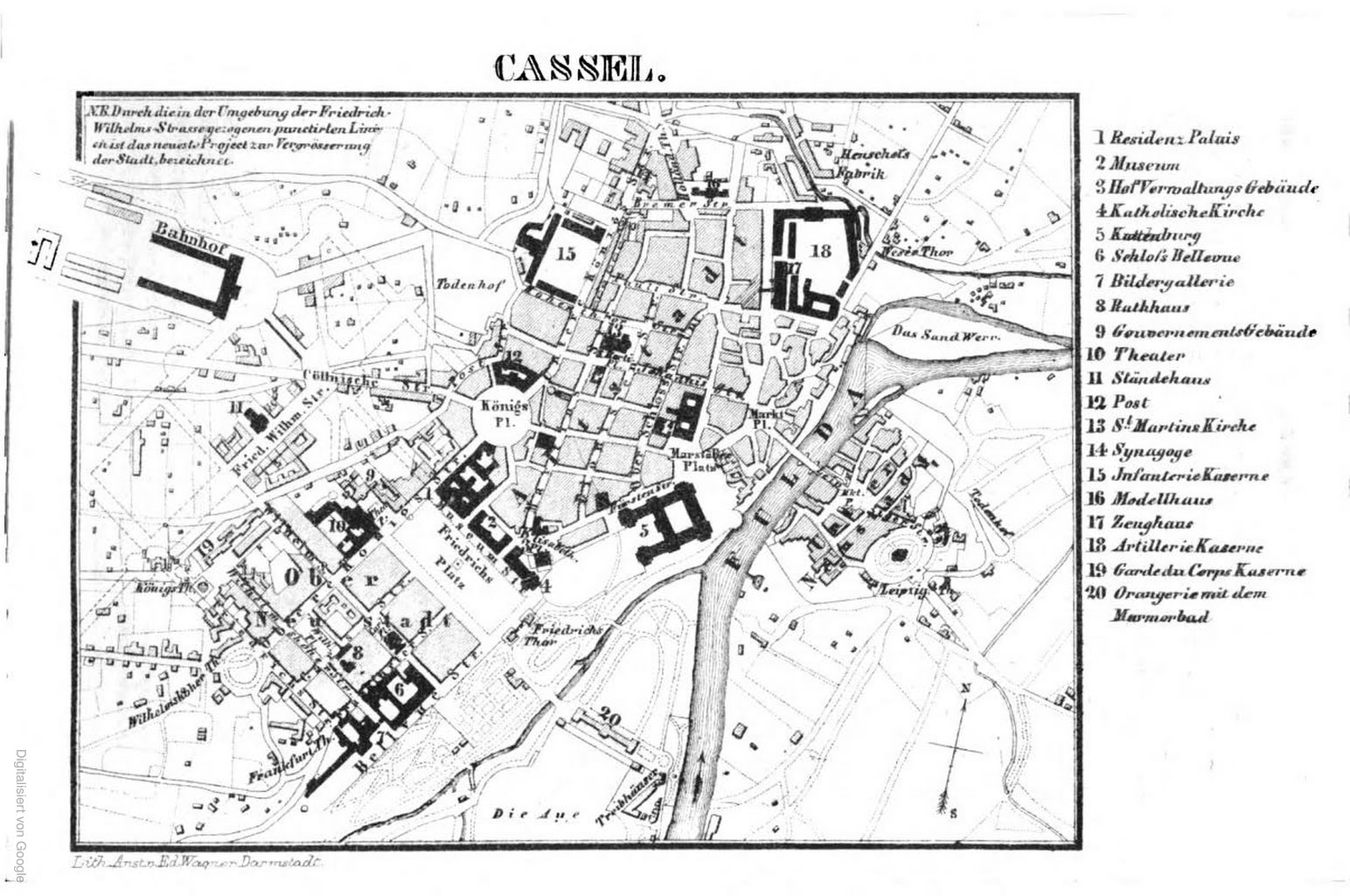
A map of Kassel in 1860: Number 1 represents the Residenzpalais, number 5 is the Chattenburg, and number 6 is Schloss Bellevue

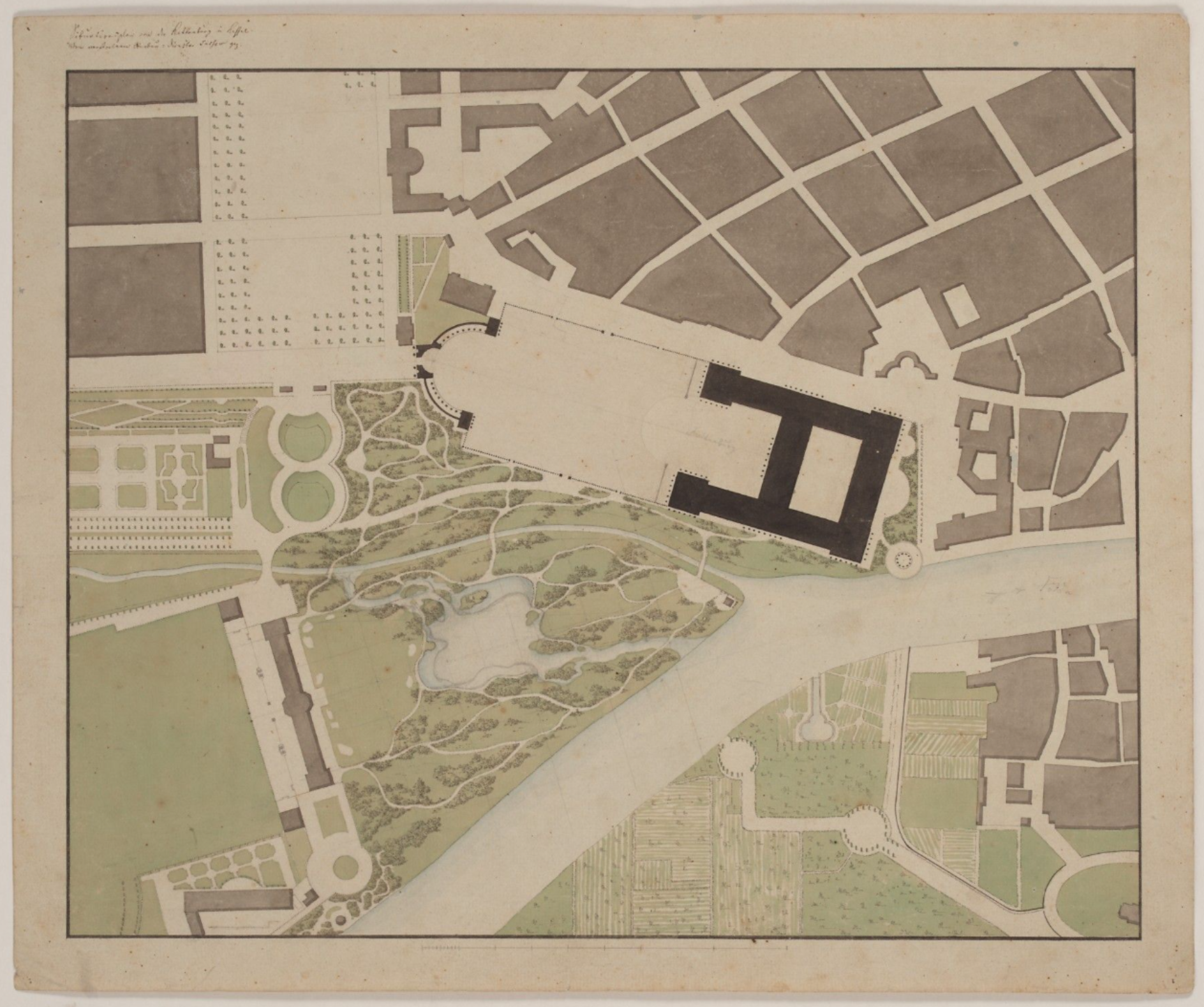
Chattenburg Palace – Location on the former site where the Kassel city palace was

The construction was located at an elevation of 156 meters above sea level, at the site of the current regional government office (German: Regierungspräsidium) overlooking the Fulda river, where the former city palace of the Landgraves of Hesse or Hesse-Kassel had previously stood.

== History ==
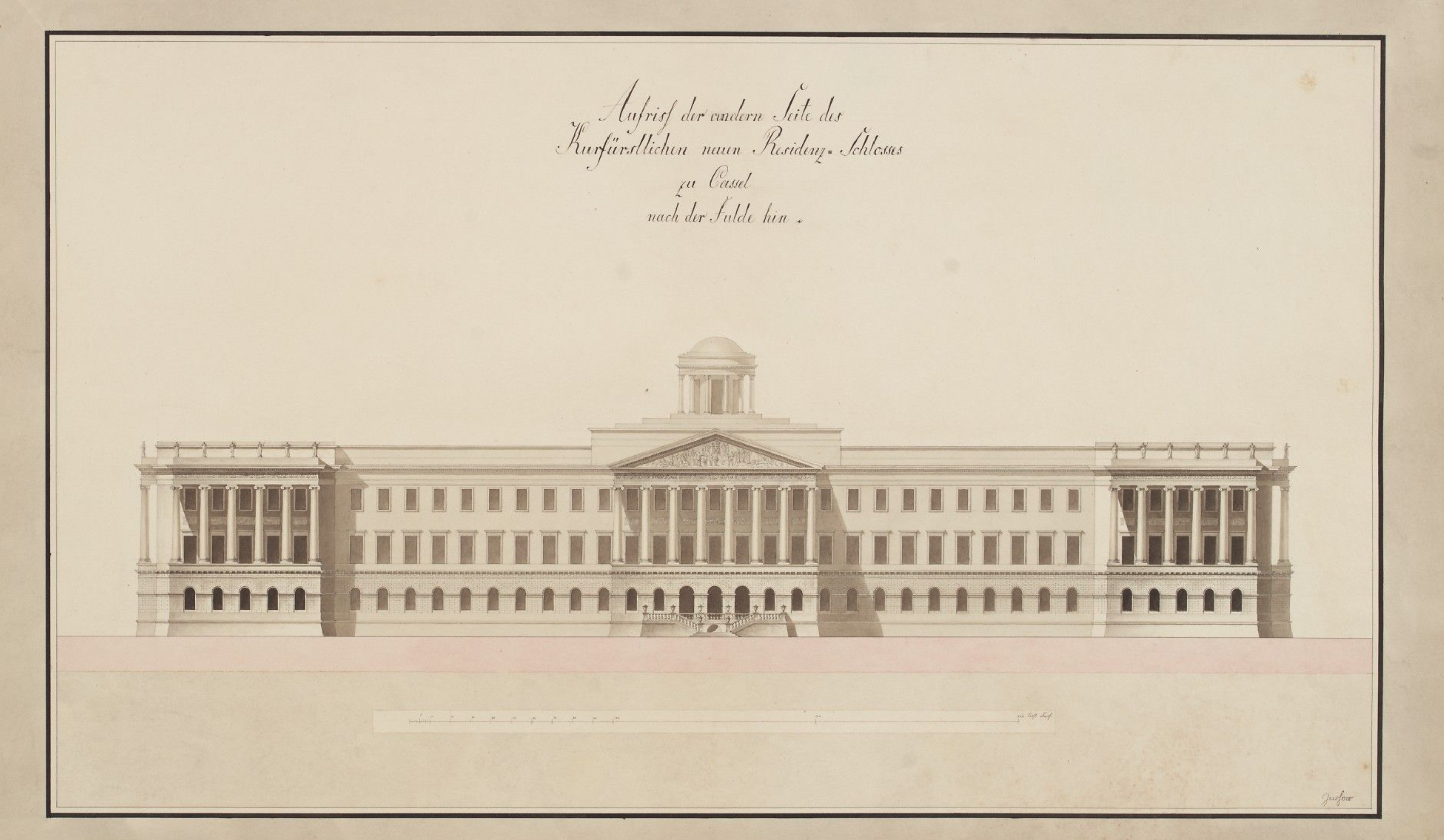
Chattenburg Palace – Palace facade facing the Fulda river by Jussow (1816 or 1817)

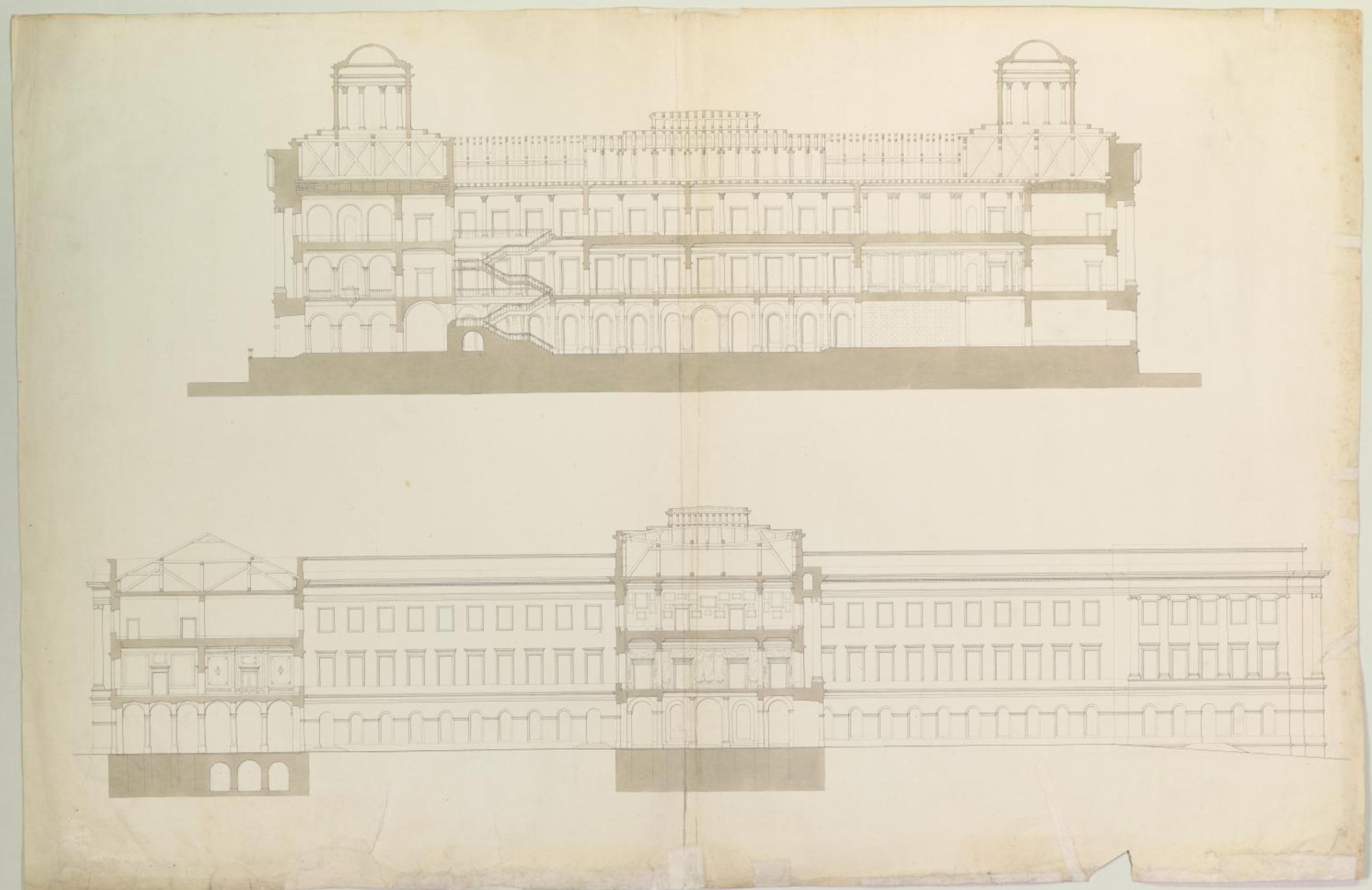
Chattenburg Palace – Cross section and longitudinal section of the design by Jussow (1821)

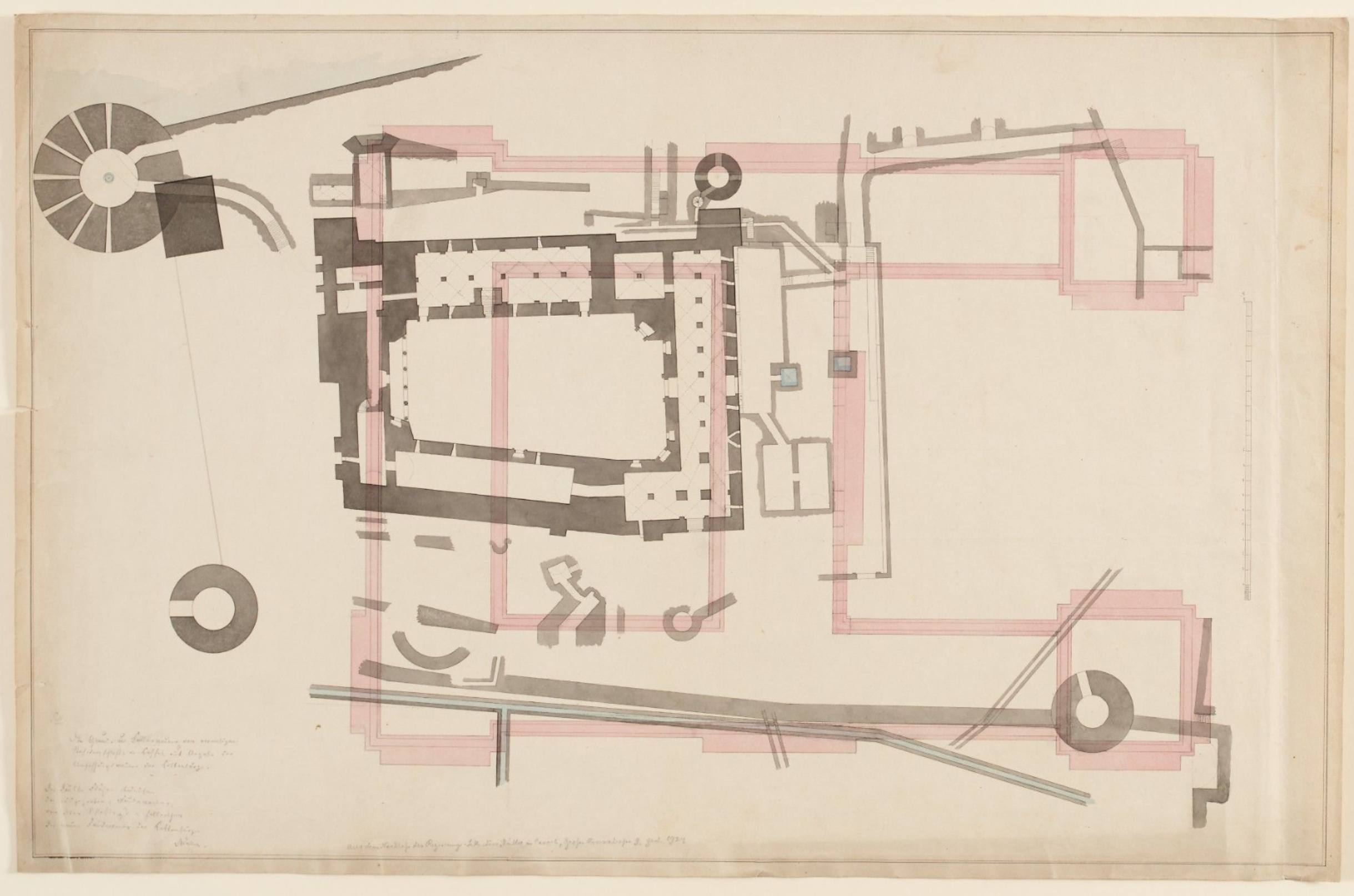
Chattenburg Palace – Location of the Palace in relation to its predecessor

The Kassel city palace was largely destroyed by a major fire on the night of 24 November 1811, during the French occupation under the Napoleonic Kingdom of Westphalia (1807–1813). King Jérôme Bonaparte moved into Schloss Bellevue and showed no interest in rebuilding the city palace.

Elector William I, who returned to his land in November 1813 after the French were expelled from Hesse, also had no interest in rebuilding the old palace. He had more ambitious plans. Although he was not successful at the Congress of Vienna in being elevated to the “King of the Chatten,” he wanted at least to build a palace worthy of a king. In December 1816, he not only had the remains of the nearly completely destroyed northwest wing of the city palace removed, but also the other three wings, which were still standing but damaged, to make way for the realization of his grand new construction plan, the "Chattenburg," designed by his architect, Heinrich Christoph Jussow.

The scale and expense of the planned neoclassical building went far beyond what was typical for a princely residence. Preparatory and foundation work started in June 1817 and took a long time to complete. The ceremonial laying of the foundation stone did not take place until 27 June 1820. The complex stretched from west-northwest to east-southeast, high above the Fulda River meadow. A four-winged building, measuring approximately 50 × 60 meters, enclosed a large courtyard, and to the east, two more wings of around 50 meters each extended in a U-shape from the main building. The entire complex was intended to be three stories high.

When the builder, William I, died at the age of 78 on 27 February 1821, only the first floor had been completed in its raw structure. Afterward, work was halted because his son and successor, Elector William II, preferred his palace on Friedrichsplatz, the Residenzpalais, which he expanded and significantly enlarged by constructing the Red Palace. He had different priorities for the use of personal and state finances—primarily concerning his mistress, Emilie Ortlöpp, and her well-being.

The red sandstone from the ground floor was dismantled between 1840 and 1870 and used in the construction of the nearby New Gallery between 1871 and 1874.

== How would the interior have looked? ==
On the plans, the left is to the north. The western wing was meant to contain the main staircase, similar to the staircase of the Würzburg Residence, and the guard chamber. From the guard chamber, over two antechambers you reached the throne hall in the southern wing. The south-eastern wing contained the gallery and the private appartements of the Elector. Opposite the courtyard in the north-eastern wing were the private apartments of the Electress meant. The eastern wing connecting the private apartments of the Electoral couple, contained rooms for festive purposes such as the banquet hall and dining rooms. The south-western wing contained a guest apartment for a visiting prince, while the north-western wing contained the guest apartment of the accompanying princess. This guest apartment was separated from the Electress apartment by the multi-storey chapel. The third floor would contain apartments for the lesser member of the princely family and court.

The rooms would probably have been designed in Empire style.

== Gallery: Architectural design plan of the Chattenburg Palace by Jussow ==
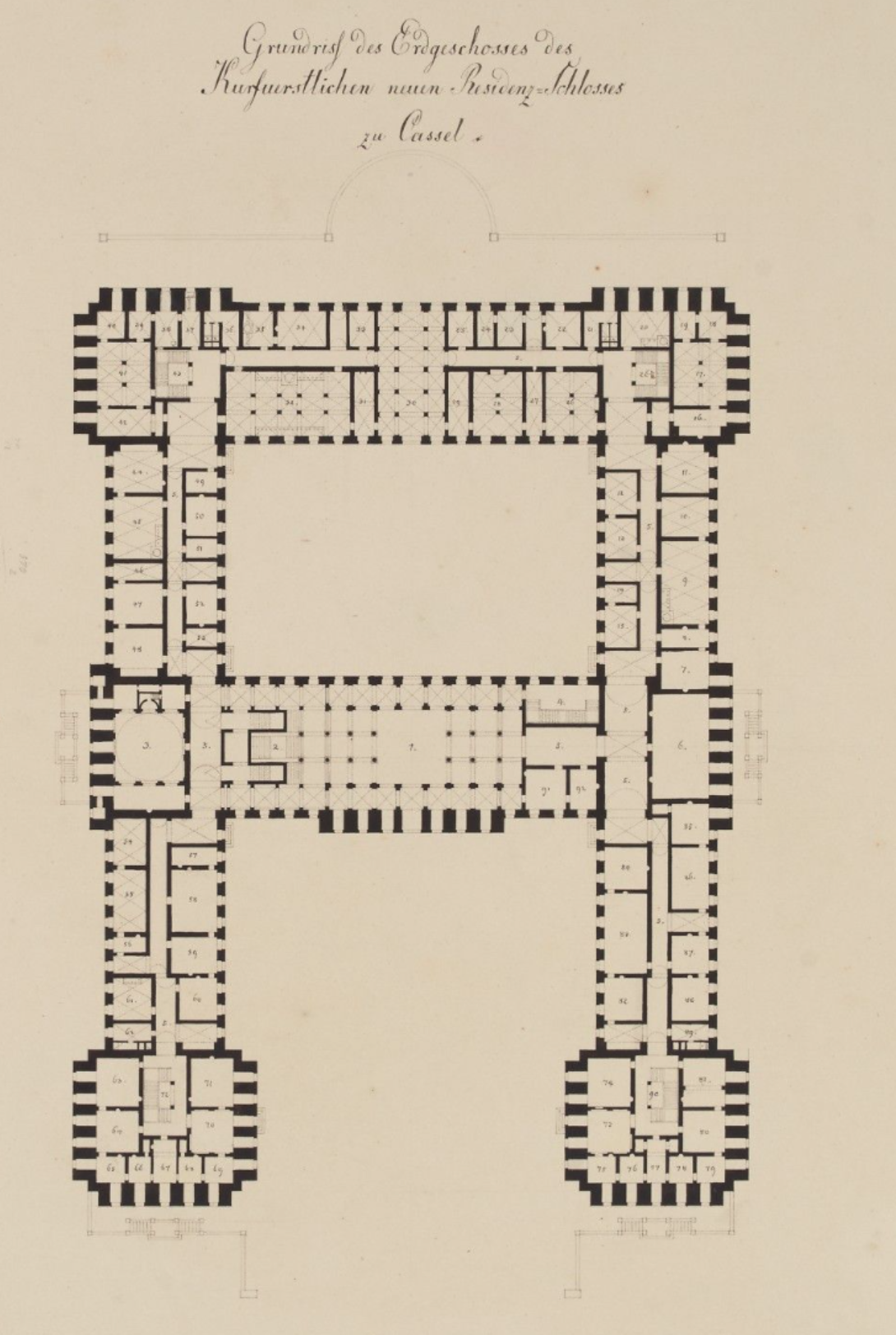
Ground Floor

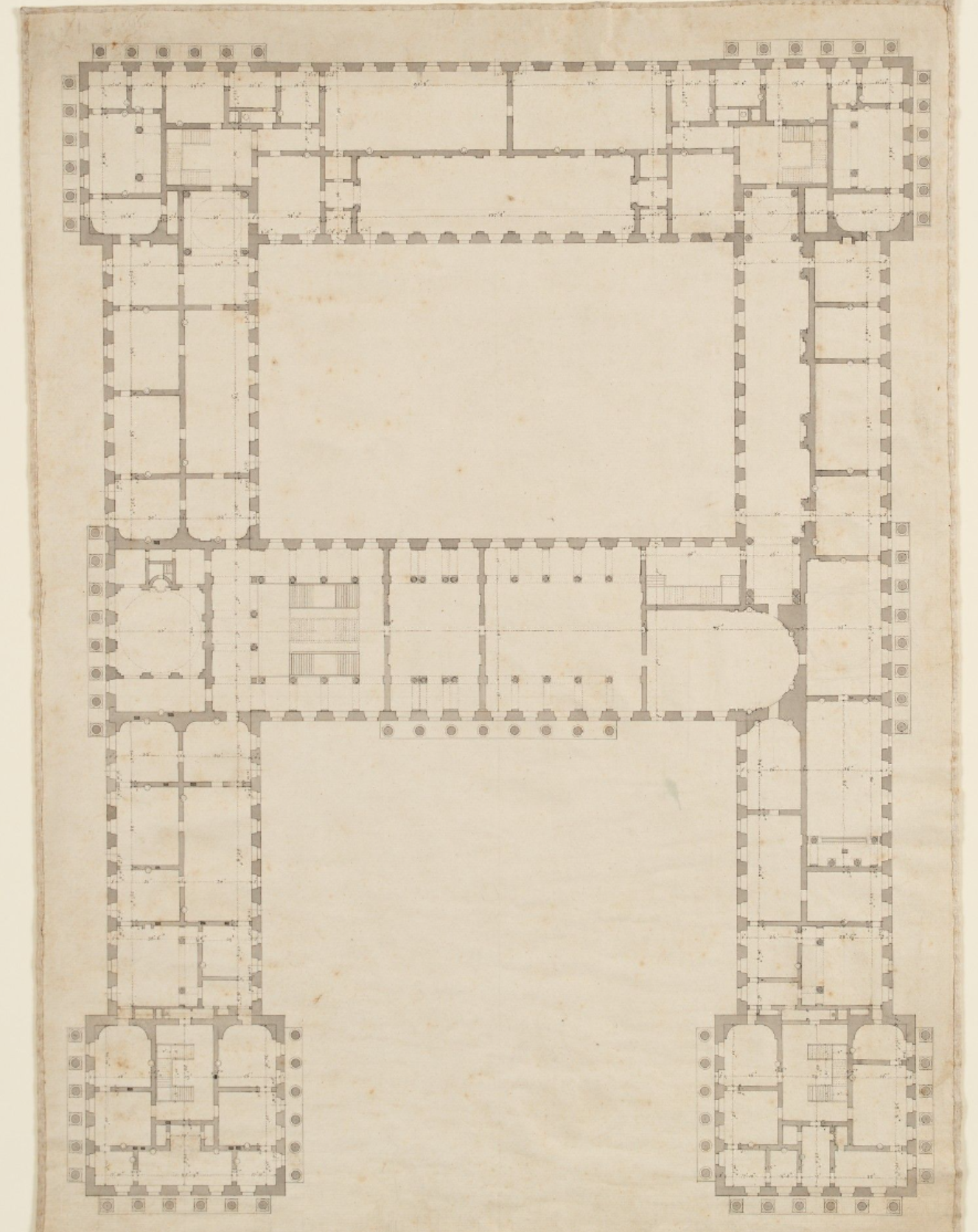
Main floor

== Subsequent Buildings ==
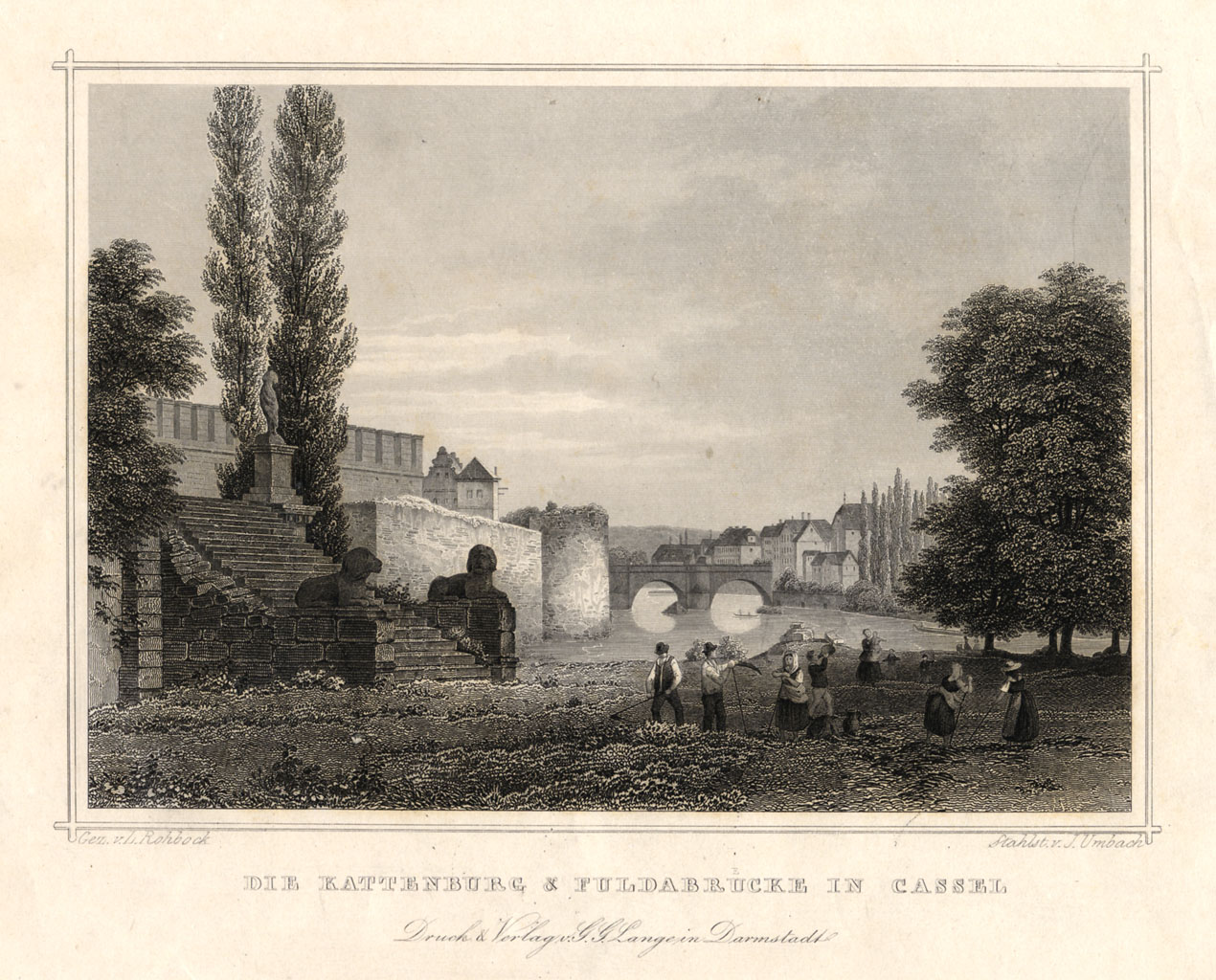
Chattenburg Palace – The ruins

After the Prussian annexation of Hesse in 1866, the new Prussian administration was initially housed in the Hessen-Rotenburg Palace on Königsplatz from October 1867. However, the space there was too limited from the start, and soon the site of the former and unfinished Chattenburg was considered for the construction of a new government building. After the remaining ruins were completely removed in 1870, the government purchased the land, along with the still-existing foundations and cellars, from the General Administration of the Electorate's Family Trust and began constructing a new monumental government and justice building in 1875, in the style of the Gründerzeit era. After seven years of construction, it was completed in 1882, and even at the time, contemporaries described it as an "oversized brick box."

The building was heavily damaged during the devastating air raid on Kassel on 22 October 1943. The ruins were removed between 1949 and 1953. From 1957 to 1960, the current office tower of the regional government was built on the same site.

== Today: The wooden design model ==
Today nothing remains of the Chattenburg palace except for the designs and a wooden model. The latter was made by Jussow upon request of William I to give an impression how the palace would look like. It was a detail model of the palace, together with its urban and garden surroundings. The detailed model was apparently publicly exhibited in Schloss Bellevue. The model still exists, part of the collection of Museumslandschaft Hessen Kassel, and gives an impression what may could have been.

== Gallery: Wooden design model of the Chattenburg palace (around 1818-1821) ==
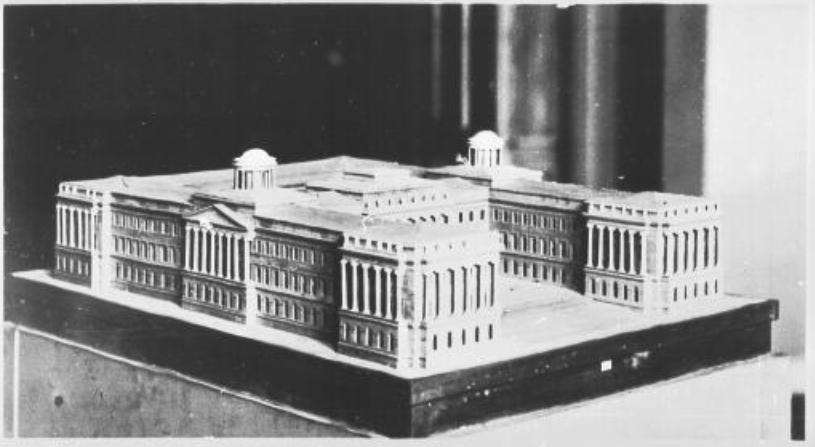
Wooden design model of the Chattenburg palace by Heinrich Christoph Jussow

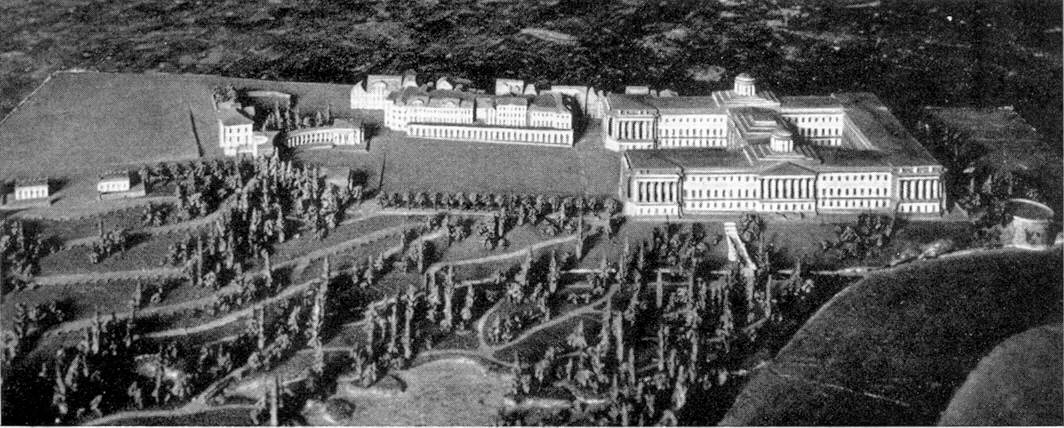
Design model of the palace with its immediate surroundings

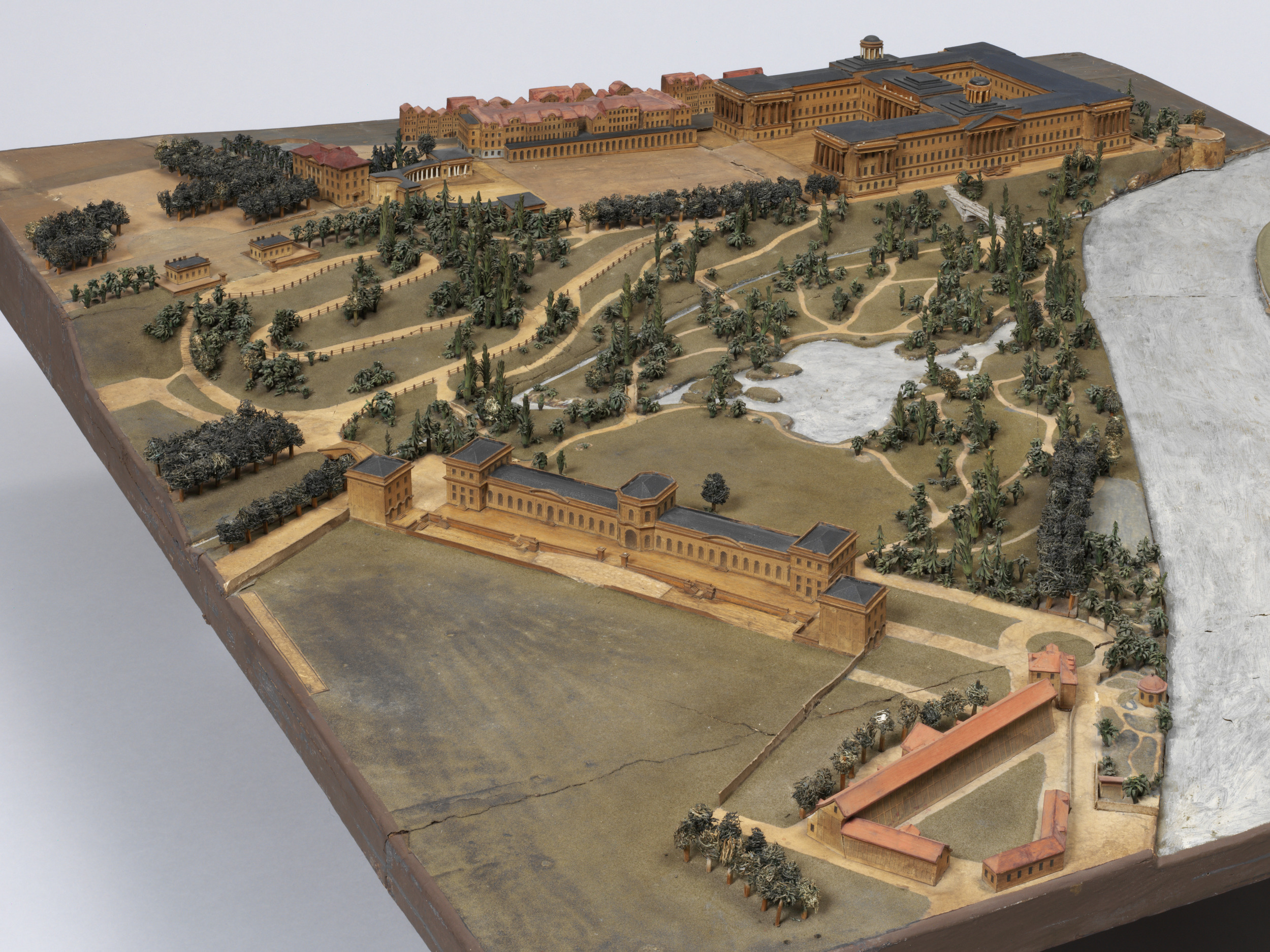
In front of the model one sees the Orangerie Palace

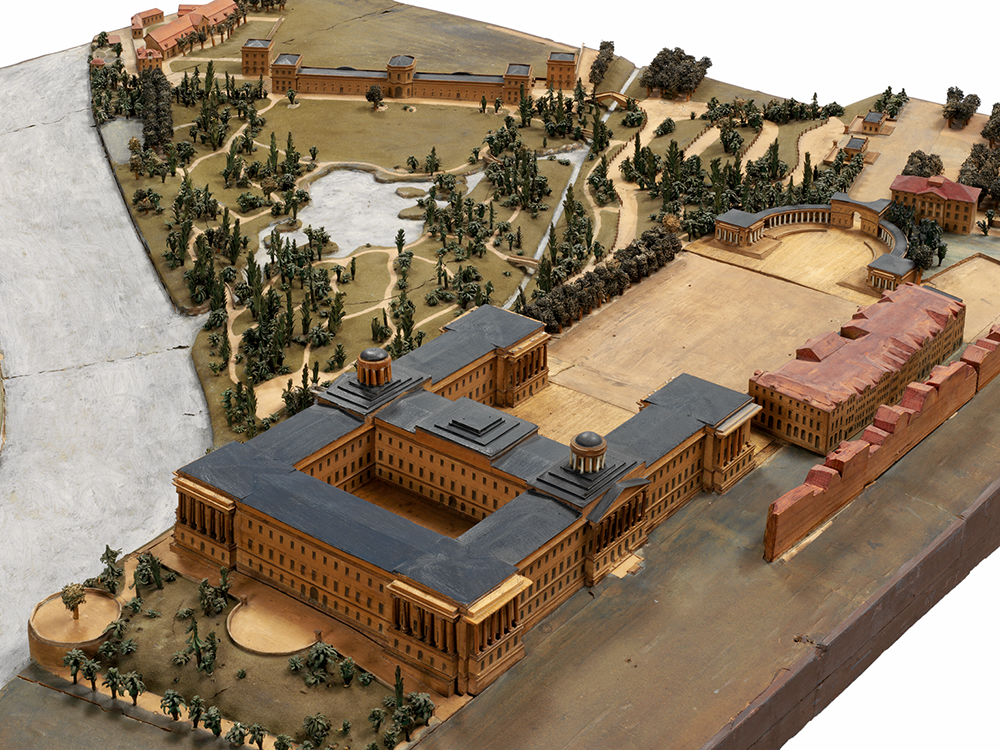
Design model in the collection of Museumslandschaft Hessen Kassel

== Literature ==
- Fenner, Gerd, ed. (1999). Heinrich Christoph Jussow. Ein hessischer Architekt des Klassizismus (in German). Worms/Kassel: Wernersche Verlagsgesellschaft/ Staatliche Museen Kassel. ISBN 3-931787-09-5.
- 150 Regierungspräsidium Kassel (PDF) (in German). Kassel. 2022.

== See also: Other examples of early 19th century palaces (realized and non realized) ==
- Royal Palace of Athens by Friedrich von Gärtner
- Brunswick Palace by Carl Theodor Ottmer
- Buckingham Palace in London by John Nash
- The Royal Palace of Brussels and the Academy Palace in Brussels, both by Tilman-François Suys
- Christiansborg Palace (2nd) in Copenhagen by Christian Frederik Hansen
- Palace of Ajuda in Lisbon
- Palace of the King of Rome - A project by Pierre Fontaine for a monumental palace in Paris for the son of Napoleon, which was never realized
- Royal Palace of Oslo by Hans Linstow
- Mikhailovsky Palace in Saint Petersburg by Carlo Rossi
- Wilhelmshöhe Palace - Jussow was also involved in the design of this palace
