= Louis Kolitz =

German painter

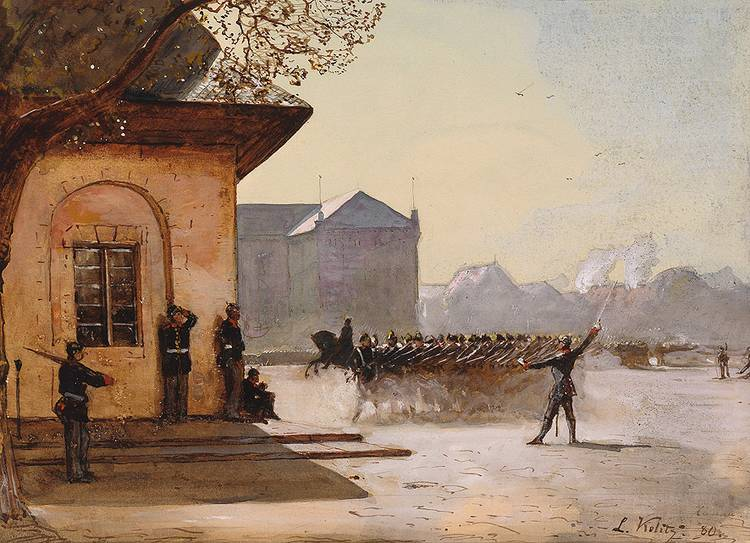
Parade Ground, Hanau

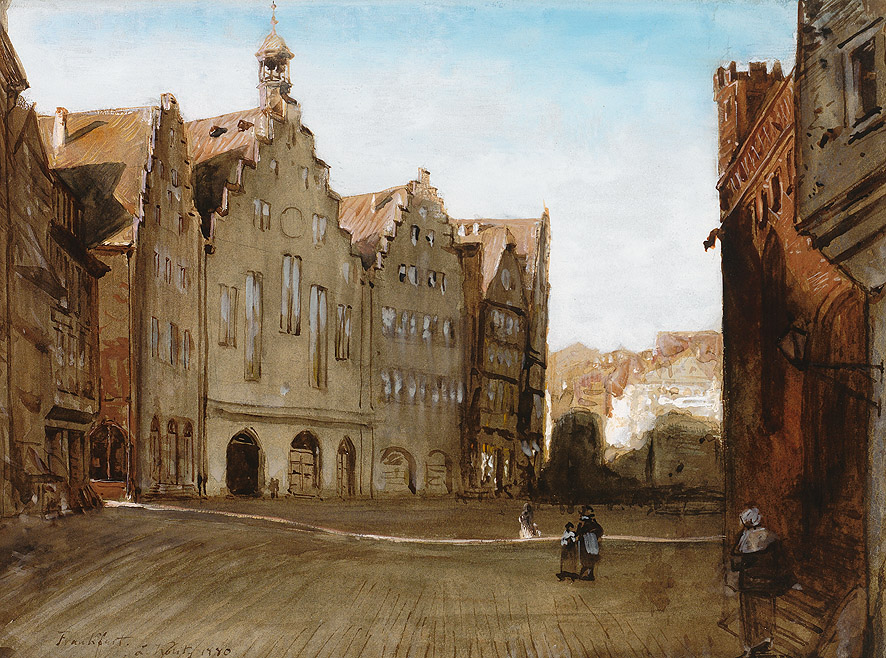
Frankfurt am Main, Street Scene

Louis Kolitz (5 April 1845, in Tilsit – 24 July 1914, in Berlin) was a German painter who worked in a wide variety of genres, including history painting, military art, portraits, landscapes and vedute. For many years, he served as Director of the Kunsthochschule Kassel.

== Biography ==
From 1862 to 1864, he studied at the Prussian Academy of Arts in Berlin then, from 1864 to 1869, at the Kunstakademie Düsseldorf. His teachers included Oswald Achenbach, Karl Ferdinand Sohn and Eduard Bendemann. He served as a volunteer in both the Austro-Prussian War and the Franco-Prussian War.

After that, he worked as a portrait painter in Düsseldorf from 1872 to 1879 and was a member of Malkasten (paint box) a progressive artists' association. He also created several paintings based on his war experiences, which were criticized for being too dark and realistic.

He married Louise Cohnitz who was born into a jewish merchant family in 1872 and they had five children, including the painter, Hans Kolitz (1874–1961).

In 1879, he was named Director of the Kunsthochschule Kassel; a position he would hold until 1911. During his tenure, he was especially committed to the training of drawing teachers. Among his notable students were Heinrich Otto, Wilhelm Schmidthild and Heinrich Kiel. He continued to paint portraits, but also created murals for public buildings, all of which were destroyed during World War II. In addition, he travelled widely throughout Western Europe, painting urban scenes.

Following his retirement, he moved to Berlin and died there, shortly before the beginning of World War I.

Most of his works were little known until 1920, when they were part of a 75th anniversary celebration at the Galerie Heinemann in Munich. Later, the New Gallery in kassel acquired a number of works from his daughter, Martha. Some of his paintings were displayed at the documenta 14 exhibit in 2017. As he was inconsistent about signing his works, many may still be unattributed.

== Sources ==
- Kolitz, Louis. In: Friedrich von Boetticher: Malerwerke des neunzehnten Jahrhunderts. Beitrag zur Kunstgeschichte. Vol. I, Dresden 1895, pg.783.
- Ulrich Schmidt (Ed.), Andrea Linnebach: Louis Kolitz 1845−1914. Katalog Staatl. Kunstsammlungen Kassel, Kassel 1990, ISBN 3-925272-28-3.
- Petra-Maria Jocks: Louis Kolitz (1845−1914) : ein Maler zwischen Tradition und Innovation. Dissertation, Frankfurt am Main 1993.
- Susanne Schunter-Kleemann: Cohnitz & Company : Lebenswege einer rheinischen Kaufmannsfamilie (1750-1950), Bremen, 2014.
