= Neue Galerie =

Neue Galerie may refer to:

- New Gallery (Kassel), an art museum in Kassel, Germany
- Neue Galerie (Vienna), now the Galerie St. Etienne in New York, an art gallery established by Otto Kallir in 1923 in Austria
- Neue Galerie Graz, a modern art museum in Graz, Austria; part of the Universalmuseum Joanneum
- Neue Galerie New York, an art museum in New York, US
- Lentos Art Museum, successor to the Neue Galerie der Stadt Linz in Austria

== See also ==
- Galerie nächst St. Stephan, an art gallery in Vienna, Austria, in the space formerly occupied by Otto Kallir's Neue Gallery
- Neue Nationalgalerie, an art museum in Berlin
- New Gallery (disambiguation)
