= Heinrich Otto =

German painter

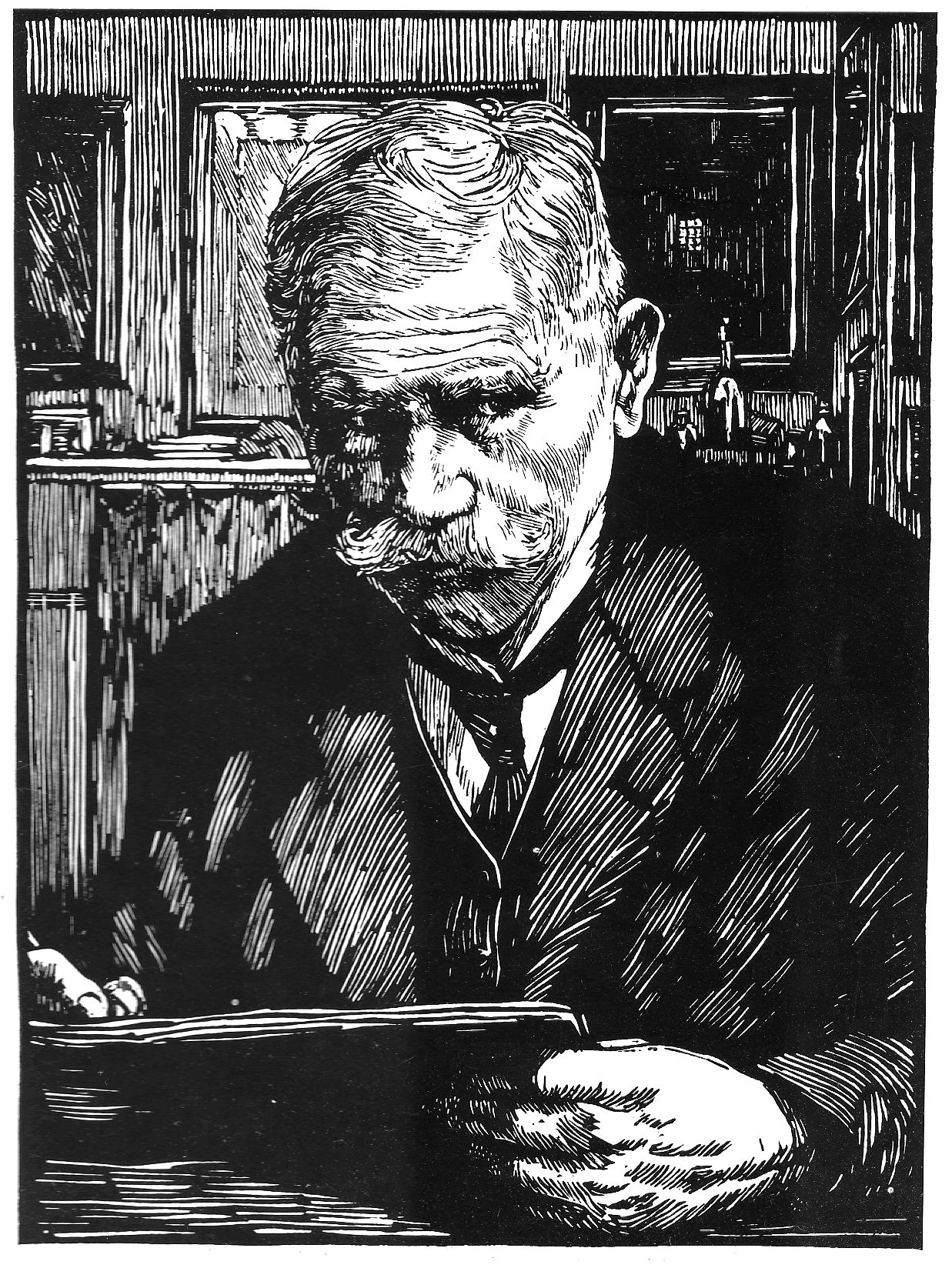
Self-portrait (date unknown)

Heinrich Otto (6 July 1858 – 13 May 1923) was a German painter, lithographer, woodcut artist, and etcher.

== Life and work ==
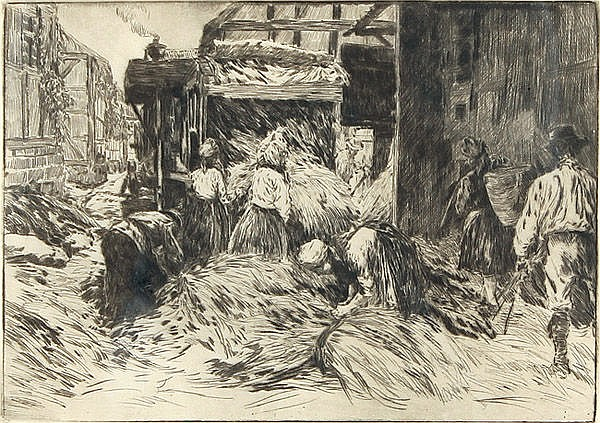
Threshing

He was born in Homberg. He was the second child born to Johannes Otto (1828–1889), a farmer and fruit seller, and his wife, Anna Gertrude née Scheibeler. At the age of fourteen, he began an apprenticeship as a sculptor, in Kassel. At twenty, he was accepted into a sculpting class taught by Karl Hassenpflug. He then spent two years at the Kunsthochschule Kassel, with Louis Kolitz and Carl Wünnenberg. After 1881, he was a regular visitor to the Willingshäuser Artists' Colony.

In 1889, he moved to Düsseldorf, and lived next door to the Kunstakademie. He also became associated with the progressive artists' group, Malkasten, which included some of the painters he had known at Willingshäuser. From 1898 to 1902, he was one of their Board members and took numerous painting trips throughout Germany. In 1901, he was awarded Dresden's "Goldene Staatsmedaille" for his lithograph, Mondnacht (moon night), which gained him a wider audience among private collectors. From 1903, he worked as a painting and drawing teacher for young women. His summers were often spent in Willingshäuser.

During World War I, he lived in Wernswig, where he managed a farm belonging to one of his nephews, who had been drafted. The farmhouse became a frequent meeting place for painters from the Willingshäuser colony. He continued to paint prolifically, adding harvests to his repertoire of themes. After the war, some his designs went to make up the "Hessenkunst-Kalendar" for 1920. He returned to Düsseldorf, where he had been appointed a Professor at the Kunstakademie, and died there in 1923, shortly before he would have turned sixty-five, from pneumonia.

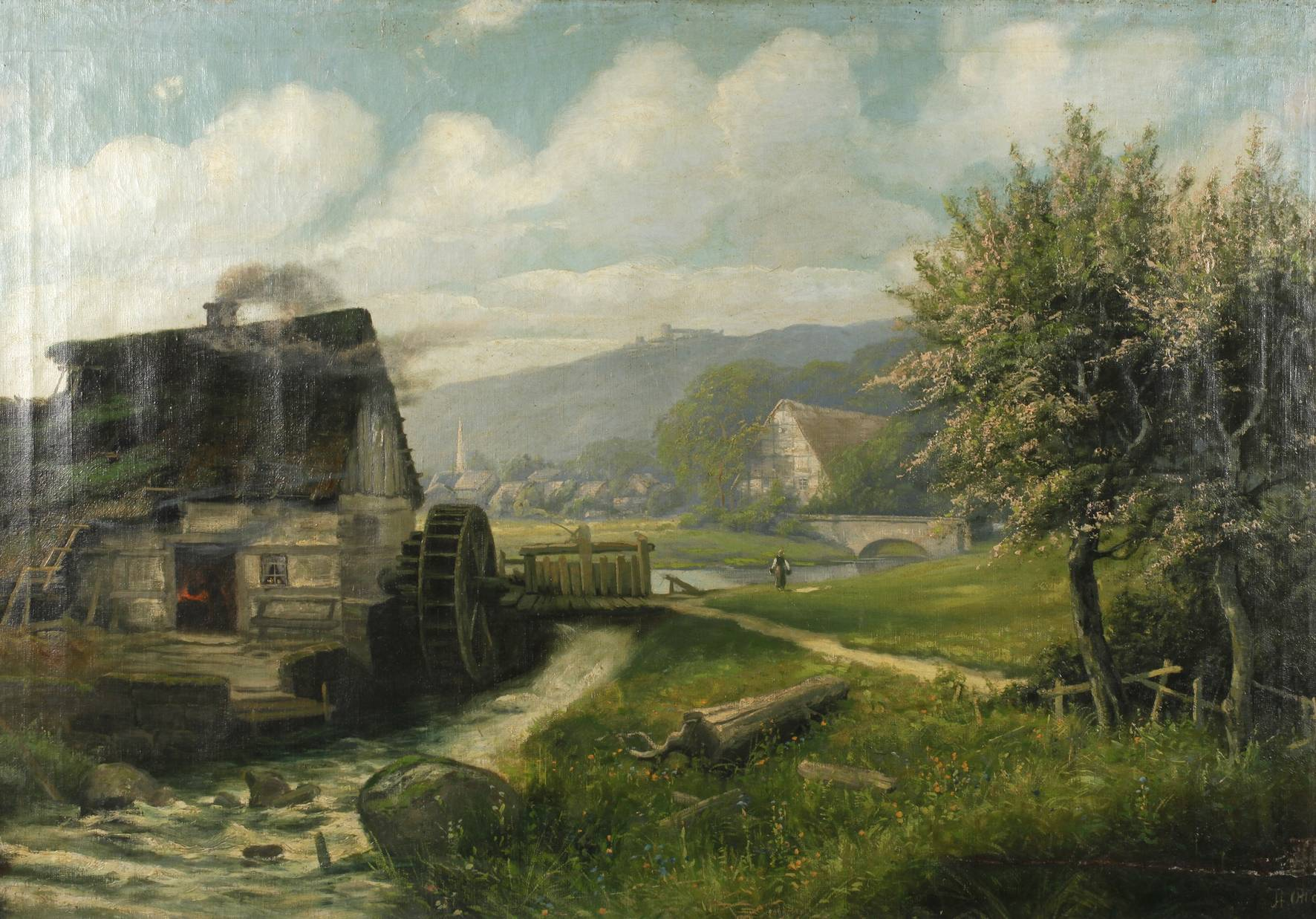
Blacksmith's Shop in a Spring Landscape

His works may be seen at the Neue Galerie, Kassel, Museum der Schwalm, Ziegenhain, and the Heimatmuseum Homberg.

== Sources ==
- Carl Bantzer: "Heinrich Otto", In: Christian Rauch (Ed.), Hessenkunst. Marburg, 1920, pg.49
- Walter Cohen, "Otto, Heinrich", In: Allgemeines Lexikon der Bildenden Künstler von der Antike bis zur Gegenwart, Vol. 26: Olivier–Pieris, E. A. Seemann, Leipzig 1932
- Ernst Hager: Der Malerradierer Heinrich Otto, Bagel Verlag, Düsseldorf, 1923.
- Wilhelm Schäfer. "Heinrich Otto"", In: Die Rheinlande, #8, vol.4, April 1908, pp.89–90
- Henriette Schmidt-Bonn: "Heinrich Otto", In: Ingeborg Schnack (Ed.), Lebensbilder aus Kurhessen und Waldeck, Vol.2, Elwert-Braun, Marburg, 1940.
- Rainer Zimmermann: "Heinrich Otto – Maler und Radierer", In: Hessische Heimat, #9, 1959/60, Vol.1, pp. 16–18
