= Siglinde Kallnbach =

German artist

Siglinde Kallnbach (born in 1956 in Tann, Hesse) is an internationally active German artist. Her work includes performance art, installation art, multimedia art, photography, and art intervention.

== Biography ==
From 1976 to 1983, Kallnbach studied at the Hochschule für bildende Künste in Kassel and attended the classes of Harry Kramer, Karl Oskar Blase, Georg Bussmann and Heiner Georgsdorf. She received a scholarship by the Evangelische Studienwerk Villigst. In 1977, Kallnbach spent an academic year in Auckland. In 1983, she graduated in fine arts, partly with the performance Examensperformance L(e)ine, and passed her Staatsexamen (Teacher Certificate Examination) in art education and English studies. Since that time, she has pursued her career as an international artist. In 1985, she was awarded a prize by the Robert Bosch Stiftung. Several trips led her to Oceania and South-East Asia in order to study, exhibit her work, or do art projects. Kallnbach held teaching positions at the Musashino Art University Tokyo, at the WAKO University Tokyo, at the Fachhochschule Bochum and the Kunstakademie Bad Reichenhall. In 2002, she finished training for multi-media design. Siglinde Kallnbach lives and works in Cologne.

== Life and work ==
Since the end of the 1970s, Siglinde Kallnbach deals with socially and politically relevant subjects in her performances and interventions such as discrimination, racism, war, and injustice. Through her frequent travels, she is concerned with transcultural aspects, e.g. basic human needs and rituals, which she cross-culturally compares to facilitate dialogue beyond cultural borders. In doing so, using her own body as an instrument of physical perception is of central relevance. Until today, Siglinde Kallnbach realizes the impact of social conditions and predicaments through her own body. In her early work, this often implied carrying herself to physical extremes. Kallnbach comprehensively includes photography, various objects and materials in her performances and installations and conveys complex cultural meanings by her highly symbolic acts. These do not only refer to an individually defined myth, but transfer her very own existential experience into a wider social context. Moreover, an important aspect of her artistic work is the active involvement of others. For example, in the second part of her Trilogy Kleinsassen (1985), she was able to unite 360 participations from 39 countries in her exhibition. For her project Wunschspur-Wishingtrack (1999–2001), she collected more than 4000 wishes for the future from all over the world and transformed them into a 460 m abstract track, which she presented in a maintenance tunnel underneath the Rhine on New Year's Eve 2000 and 2001. Siglinde Kallnbach's artistic work is closely related to life and the everyday. Since she was diagnosed with cancer for the first time in 2000, she started to address the disease and its impact also in her art, while she places the individual suffering into a wider social context. With her interactive project a performancelife (since 2001) that serves to express empathy with cancer patients, Kallnbach creates options to release creative energy so as to convey its transformative power for the benefit of patients, their relatives, and the medical staff. For her social commitment, she was called she who loves fire in Japan as early as the 1980s.

== Solo performances and solo exhibitions (selection) ==
- 1978 first performances in New Zealand and Australia
- 1984–86 process art trilogy (Feuertor etc.), Kleinsassen/Hessen
- 1987 Judicium Ignis – 500 Jahre Hexenhammer, Exhibition at the Hochschulgalerie Kausch and women's procession, Kassel
- 1990 When will Mr. Saito buy van Gogh's ear?, performance, installation and documentation, Heineken Village Gallery, Tokyo
- 1992 Ei des Phönix, three performances, Theater im Fridericianum, Kassel
- 1993 Fremdenfreude II, performance and installation, Schaufenstergalerie Kassel
- 1994 Die Rose von Jericho, performance festival, Oldenburg
- 1997 Rheinspur, art intervention, GEW Tunnel underneath the Rhine, exhibition Rheinspur/performance taubenrot, Antoniterkirche Cologne
- 2000 Wunschspur, exhibition, Vonderau Museum Fulda
- since 2001 art project a performancelife
- 2002 Van Gogh's Dream, performance, Aomori Contemporary Art Center, Aomori/Japan
- 2005 Rheingold – Shinkansen, exhibition, Kita Gallery, Yamatokooriyama-City / Nara-Ken
- 2007 HC – BC, exhibition and performance, KunstWerk Köln
- 2008/09 Ludwig Forum for International Art, Aachen

== Works in public collections ==
- Art Collection Deutsche Bank
- Kölnisches Stadtmuseum
- Vonderau Museum Fulda
- Stadtmuseum Siegburg
- Stadt Kölnischer Kunstbesitz
- Muzej i galerija Ijentnikovca Buca/Centar za kulturu Tivat
- Staatliche Kunstsammlungen – Neue Galerie Kassel
- documenta Archiv Kassel
- Kunststation Kleinsassen
- Stadtsparkasse Wuppertal

=== Solo exhibitions (selection) ===
- Rheingold – Shinkansen, Salon Verlag Köln, 2007, ISBN 978-3-89770-255-4
- Wunschspur – Wishingtrack, Salon Verlag Köln, 2002, ISBN 3-89770-166-9
- Rheinspur, Salon Verlag Köln 1999, ISBN 3-932189-51-5
- Siglinde Kallnbach – Performance, dalebo Verlag, Köln 1995, ISBN 3-9804380-1-5
- Siglinde Kallnbach: Todesmasken für van Gogh/Japan 1990, Kunststation Kleinsassen 1991
- Verbindungen, Kunststation Kleinsassen 1985
- Feuertor, Kunststation Kleinsassen 1984

=== Group exhibitions (selection) ===
- Alles Prophetinnen, Frauenmuseum Bonn, 2006, ISBN 3-928239-46-5
- Performa 04 – FestiwalSztukj Zywej/Live Art Festival – Private Impact, Szczecin/Polen, 2004
- Kunst auf Rezept, Salon Verlag Köln 2001, Museum Ratingen 2001 und andere Orte, 2002/2003, ISBN 3-89770-143-X
- Shozo Shimamoto – Siglinde Kallnbach, Japanisches Kulturinstitut Köln, Köln 2000
- Gabriele Münter Preis 1997, Frauen Museum Bonn/Kunsthalle Dominikanerkirche Osnabrück/Galerie am *Fischmarkt Erfurt, ISBN 3-928239-35-X
- Stadt der Frauen, Frauenmuseum Bonn 1995
- Multimedialistinnen: Performerinnen-Woche Erfurt, Kunsthaus Erfurt 1992
- InterAzioni- Laboratorio Internationale delle Performances et Installazioni, Cagliari/Sardinien 1990

=== Publications (selection) ===
- Siglinde Kallnbach: "Performance – der perforierte Begriff – ein Plädoyer gegen die Lehrbarkeit von Performance", in: Marie-Luise Lange (Hrsg.): Performativität erfahren. Aktionskunst lehren – Aktionskunst lernen. Schibri Verlag, Berlin/Milow/Strasburg, 2006, ISBN 3-937895-42-6
- Siglinde Kallnbach: "Judicium Ignis: 500 Jahre Hexenhammer – Frauenprozession durch die Kasseler Innenstadt", in: Feministische Kulturpädagogik: Projekte und Konzepte, Akademie Remscheid 1989, ISBN 3-923128-05-3

== Bibliography ==
- James Putnam: Art and Artifact. – The Museum As Medium, Thames & Hudson, London 2001, ISBN 0-500-23790-5
- 20 Jahre Frauenmuseum Bonn, Bonn 2001, ISBN 3-928239-49-X
- Religion betrifft uns: Friedrich Spee, Verlag Bergmoser und Höller, ISSN 0936-5141, Aachen 1996
- Thomas Illmaier: "Siglinde Kallnbach: Schamanistische Performance", in: Yearbook for Ethnomedicine and the Study of Consciousness, no. 4, Verlag für Wissenschaft und Bildung Berlin 1995, ISBN 3-86135-031-9
- "Tempelopfer und Feuerrituale", in: KUNSTFORUM International, Band 130/1995
- "EL Interview Siglinde Kallnbach", in: The English Journal, Tokio, März 1992 (mit Audio-Kassette)
- Elisabeth Jappe: Performance Ritual Prozeß – Handbuch der Aktionskunst in Europa, Prestel-Verlag, München/New York 1993, ISBN 3-7913-1300-2
