= Rudolf Havenstein =

German lawyer and central banker (1857–1923)

Rudolf E. Havenstein
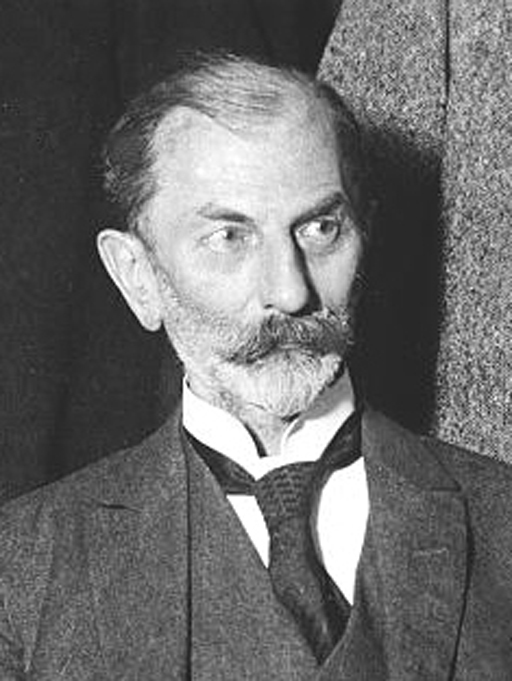
- Born: 10 March 1857; Meseritz, Prussia
- Died: 20 November 1923 (aged 66); Berlin, Germany

Rudolf Emil Albert Havenstein (10 March 1857 – 20 November 1923) was a German lawyer and president of the Reichsbank (German central bank) during the hyperinflation of 1921–1923.

Havenstein was born in Meseritz (Międzyrzecz), Province of Posen. He came from a family of government officials and studied law in Heidelberg and Berlin. After graduation in 1876, Havenstein worked in the Prussian Justice service until 1887 when he began his career as a judge. In 1890 he moved to the Prussian Ministry of Finance. From 1900 to 1908, Havenstein was President of the Prussian State Bank. From 1908 to 1923, he was president of the Reichsbank and his signature appears on German Reichsbank notes from 1908 to 1923.

Havenstein played an important part in the hyperinflationary process in Germany since he subscribed to the widespread belief then present in Germany that the inflation was caused by the fall in the external value of the mark against foreign currencies and that the role of the Reichsbank was to print sufficient money to sustain the higher price levels. The more money that was printed the higher the price level became, so the Reichsbank then printed even more money and so on. In other words, rather than following the Quantity Theory of Money in ascribing inflation to the excessive printing of money, Havenstein believed that money had to be printed to feed the rising demand for money within the German economy as prices were driven up by the fall in the exchange rate. It was Havenstein's death in November 1923 that helped to bring this policy to an end and, with it, the hyperinflation.

Havenstein was involved in the introduction of war bonds at the beginning of the First World War.

He died in Berlin and is buried in St. Anne's Cemetery in Berlin-Dahlem.

== See also ==
- Karl Helfferich
- Andreas Hermes
- Weimar Republic
- Hyperinflation
- Inflation in the Weimar Republic

Government offices
Preceded by Richard Koch	President of the German central bank 1908–1923	Succeeded by Hjalmar Schacht
