= Eva Moll =

German contemporary artist

Eva Moll (born June 15, 1975, in Karlsruhe) is a German contemporary artist. Moll works in fine art printmaking, drawing and painting as well as its expansion in the areas of performance art and conceptual art. Besides her works on canvas and paper, her Œuvre includes Happenings, video art and installations. A large part of her work stands in the traditions of appropriation art, pop art, fluxus and action painting. She lives and works in New York and Berlin.

== Life and work ==
As a student, Eva Moll took weekend courses at the Städelschule in Frankfurt am Main in 1989. After her German preparatory school graduation in 1994 at the Rudolf Koch School in Offenbach am Main, she completed a one-year internship at the fine art painter and restorer Manfred Scharpf at the Castle Zeil in Leutkirch im Allgäu. There she acquired knowledge to old master techniques and processes in the studio and exhibition making.

From 1995, Eva Moll studied at the Kunsthochschule Kassel in Germany in the fields of visual communication and fine arts. Her study focus was on free graphics, drawing and painting, with old and new media and interdisciplinary art. While studying, Moll realized the global multi-media project: "The Ornamental Symbol" on traveling in Europe, Asia, Africa and America (1996–1998). This was followed by the urban visual diary project "Eva in The Big Apple" in New York City (1998–2000). In 2000, Eva Moll graduated with an artistic university degree (M.f.A.) under the Professors Walter Rabe and Paul Driessen.

In 2000, Moll migrated to New York. From 2000 to 2002, she worked as an assistant in the studio of American pop-artist Peter Max. In 2001, Moll had her first show at the La Mama Gallery on the Lower East Side. In 2002, she launched her first studio in New York after touring Los Angeles, San Francisco, Big Sur, Portland, Oregon, and Seattle. In 2003, she founded the collective art group Galaxy Girls NYC. Since then, the visual artist with curatorial practice organized exhibitions and happenings in interdisciplinary space. Moll is active in the public space of major cities as well as in the specialized areas of trade fairs, museums, galleries, art associations and in various groups of the international art market and art scene.

In 2006, Moll traveled with her project Europe ArtTourIsm to Athens, Barcelona, Budapest, Copenhagen and Luxembourg. In 2007, she performed unofficially with her artistic figure EVE at the openings of the art fairs Documenta 12, at the Armory Show in New York and at the Art Forum Berlin. That same year, she expanded her activities as a studio artist and exhibition maker in the New York Metropolitan Area to the Rhine-Main area of Germany. In 2009, Moll became an active member in the international art club Kunstverein Familie Montez in Frankfurt am Main. In 2011, she was appointed professor of contemporary art at the Academy of Interdisciplinary Processes in Offenbach am Main. In 2012, Moll got honored for the project Schrankstipendium with an art award by the maecenia Frankfurt - Foundation for Women in Science and Artsth the guerrilla-performance of her art figure EVE Moll provided at the opening of the dOCUMENTA (13) in Kassel Germany for sensation. Moll is chairman of the New York organization Arts in Action. Since 2013, Moll tours with the art figure EVE performances and exhibitions in Rome, Florence, Cinque Terre, Monaco, Paris, Berlin, London, Chicago, Miami and New York. In 2014, she moved with her German studio to Berlin. Her American studio remains in New York.
