= Hjalmar Schacht =

German politician, banker, and economist (1877–1970)

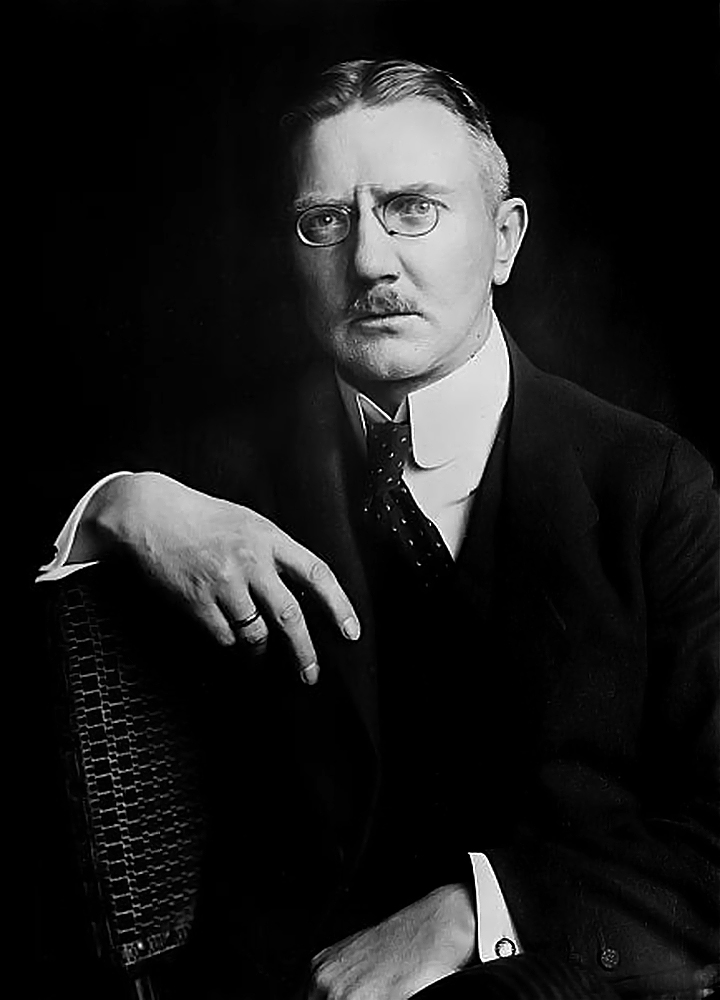

Reichsminister of Economics
- In office 3 August 1934 – 26 November 1937
- Führer: Adolf Hitler
- Chancellor: Adolf Hitler
- Preceded by: Kurt Schmitt
- Succeeded by: Hermann Göring

General Plenipotentiary for War Economy
- In office 21 May 1935 – 26 November 1937
- Preceded by: Office established
- Succeeded by: Walther Funk

President of the Reichsbank
- In office 22 December 1923 – 7 March 1930
- Preceded by: Rudolf E. A. Havenstein
- Succeeded by: Hans Luther
- In office 17 March 1933 – 20 January 1939
- Preceded by: Hans Luther
- Succeeded by: Walther Funk

Reichsminister without Portfolio
- In office 26 November 1937 – 22 January 1943

Personal details
- Born: Horace Greeley Hjalmar Schacht; 22 January 1877 Tingleff, German Empire
- Died: 3 June 1970 (aged 93) Munich, West Germany
- Resting place: Munich Ostfriedhof
- Party: German Democratic Party (1918–1926); Independent (1926–1965); Nazi Party (1937–1943; as honorary member); Action Group of Independent Germans (1965–1970)
- Spouses: Luise Sowa (m. 1903; died 1940) Manci Vogler (m. 1941)
- Children: 4
- Education: Ludwig-Maximilians-Universität München; Leipzig University; Friedrich Wilhelm University of Berlin; University of Paris; Kiel University (PhD)
- Profession: Banker, economist
- Awards: Golden Party Badge
- Nickname: The Dark Wizard of International Finance

Horace Greeley Hjalmar Schacht (German: [ˈjalmaʁ ˈʃaxt]; 22 January 1877 – 3 June 1970) was a German economist, banker, politician, and co-founder of the German Democratic Party. He served as the Currency Commissioner and President of the Reichsbank during the Weimar Republic. He was a fierce critic of his country's post-World War I reparations obligations. He was also central in helping create the group of German industrialists and landowners that pushed Hindenburg to appoint the first Nazi-led government.

Schacht served in Adolf Hitler's government as President of the Central Bank (Reichsbank) 1933–1939 and as Minister of Economics (August 1934 – November 1937).

While Schacht was for a time feted for his role in the German "economic miracle", he opposed elements of Hitler's policy of German re-armament insofar as it violated the Treaty of Versailles and (in his view) disrupted the German economy. His views in this regard led Schacht to clash with Hitler and Hermann Göring. He resigned as President of the Reichsbank in January 1939. He remained as a minister without portfolio and received the same salary until he left the government in January 1943.

In 1944, Schacht was arrested by the Gestapo following the assassination attempt on Hitler on 20 July 1944 because he allegedly had contact with the assassins. Subsequently, he was interned in the Ravensbrück, Flossenbürg, and Dachau concentration camps. In the final days of the war, he was one of the 139 special and clan prisoners (Note: "Clan prisoners" is a translation of the German-language term Sippenhäftlinge, which means those persons arrested because they were family members of other prisoners.) who were transported by the SS from Dachau to South Tyrol. This location is within the area named by Himmler the "Alpine Fortress", and it is speculated that the purpose of the prisoner transport was the intent of holding hostages. They were freed in Niederdorf, South Tyrol on 30 April 1945.

Schacht was tried at Nuremberg, but was acquitted despite Soviet objections. Later, a German denazification tribunal sentenced him to eight years of hard labour, which was also overturned on appeal.

== Early life and career ==
Schacht was born in Tingleff, Schleswig-Holstein (now in Denmark) to William Leonhard Ludwig Maximillian Schacht and Baroness Constanze Justine Sophie von Eggers, a native of Denmark and a granddaughter of the Danish-Holsteinian civil servant Christian von Eggers. His parents, who had spent years in the United States, originally decided on the name Horace Greeley Schacht, in honor of the American journalist Horace Greeley. However, they yielded to the insistence of the Schacht family grandmother, who firmly believed the child's given name should be Danish. After completing his Abitur at the Gelehrtenschule des Johanneums, Schacht studied medicine, philology, political science, and finance at the Ludwig-Maximilians-Universität München, Leipzig University, the Friedrich Wilhelm University of Berlin, the University of Paris and Kiel University before earning a doctorate at Kiel in 1899 – his thesis was on mercantilism.

He joined the Dresdner Bank in 1903. In 1905, while on a business trip to the United States with board members of the Dresdner Bank, Schacht met the famous American banker J. P. Morgan, as well as U.S. president Theodore Roosevelt. He became deputy director of the Dresdner Bank from 1908 to 1915. He was then a board member of the German National Bank for the next seven years, until 1922, and after its merger with the Darmstädter und Nationalbank (Danatbank), a board member of the Danatbank.

Schacht was a freemason, having joined the lodge Urania zur Unsterblichkeit in 1908.

During World War I, Schacht was assigned to the staff of General Karl von Lumm (1864–1930), the Banking Commissioner for German-occupied Belgium, to organize the financing of Germany's purchases in Belgium. He was summarily dismissed by General von Lumm when it was discovered that he had used his previous employer, the Dresdner Bank, to channel the note remittances for nearly 500 million francs of Belgian national bonds destined to pay for the requisitions.

After Schacht's dismissal from public service, he had another brief stint at the Dresdner Bank and then various positions at other banks. In 1923, Schacht applied and was rejected for the position of head of the Reichsbank, largely as a result of his dismissal from Lumm's service.

During the German Revolution of 1918–1919, Schacht became a Vernunftrepublikaner (a supporter of the Republic by reason rather than conviction) who had reservations over the parliamentary democratic system of the new Weimar Republic but supported it anyway for pragmatic reasons. Despite his rather right-liberal views, he helped found the left-liberal German Democratic Party (DDP), which took a leading role in the governing Weimar Coalition. However, Schacht later became an ally of Gustav Stresemann, the leader of the center-right German People's Party (DVP).

== Rise to President of the Reichsbank ==
Despite the blemish on his record from his service with von Lumm, on 12 November 1923, Schacht became currency commissioner for the Weimar Republic and participated in the introduction of the Rentenmark, a new currency the value of which was based on a mortgage on all of the properties in Germany. Germany entered into a brief period where it had two separate currencies: the Papiermark managed by Rudolf Havenstein, President of the Reichsbank, and the newly created Rentenmark managed by Schacht. Havenstein died on 20 November 1923.

On 22 December 1923, after Schacht's economic policies had helped battle German hyperinflation and stabilize the German Papiermark (Helfferich Plan), he was appointed President of the Reichsbank at the requests of president Friedrich Ebert and Chancellor Gustav Stresemann. Schacht's office during this time was a former charwoman's cupboard. When his secretary, Fräulein Steffeck, was later asked about his work there, she described it as follows:

What did he do? He sat on his chair and smoked in his little dark room, which still smelled of old floor cloths. Did he read letters? No, he read no letters. Did he write letters? No, he wrote no letters. He telephoned a great deal – he telephoned in every direction and to every German or foreign place that had anything to do with money and foreign exchange, as well as with the Reichsbank and the Finance Minister. And he smoked. We did not eat much during that time. We usually went home late, often by the last suburban train, travelling third class. Apart from that, he did nothing.

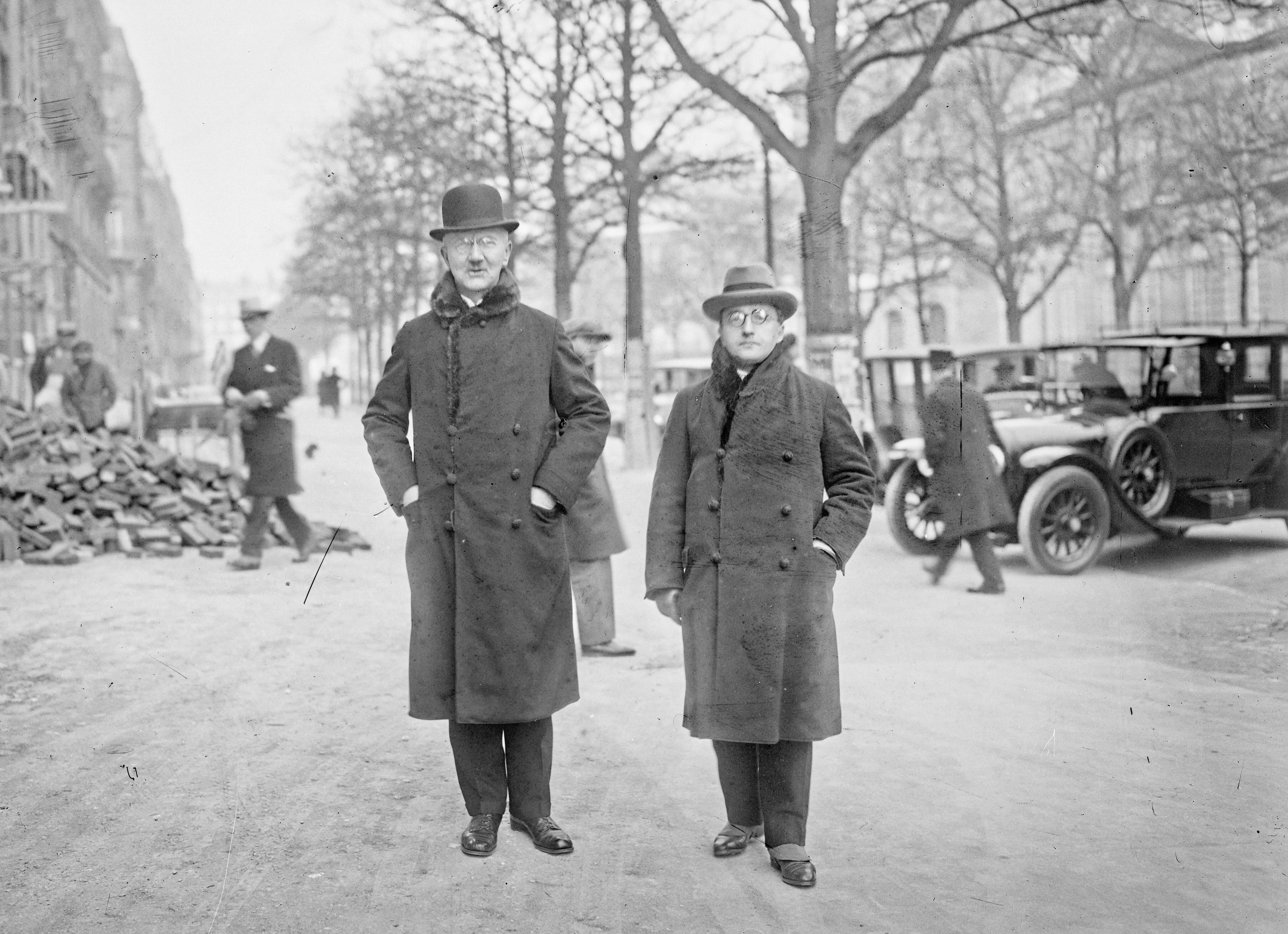
Schacht (left) and Albert Vögler in Paris, where they negotiated the Young Plan, 11 February 1929

In 1926, Schacht provided funds for the formation of IG Farben. He collaborated with other prominent economists to form the 1929 Young Plan to modify the way that war reparations were paid after Germany incurred large foreign debts under the Dawes Plan. In December 1929, he caused the fall of the Finance Minister Rudolf Hilferding by imposing upon the government his conditions for obtaining a loan. After modifications by Hermann Müller's government to the Young Plan during the Second Conference of The Hague (January 1930), he resigned as Reichsbank president on 7 March 1930. During 1930, Schacht campaigned against the war reparations requirement in the United States.

Schacht became a friend of the Governor of the Bank of England, Montagu Norman, both men belonging to the Anglo-German Fellowship and the Bank for International Settlements. Norman was so close to the Schacht family that he was godfather to one of Schacht's grandchildren.

== Involvement with the NSDAP (Nazi Party) and government ==
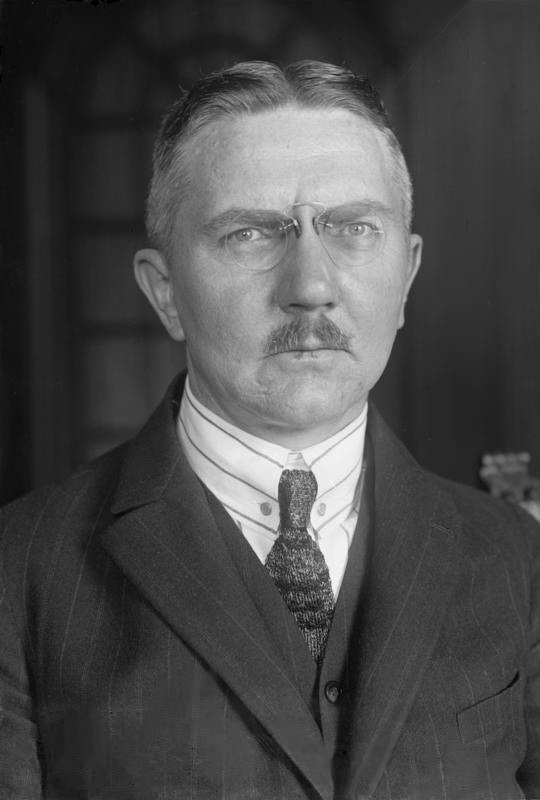
Schacht in 1931

By 1926, Schacht had left the shrinking DDP and began increasingly lending his support to the Nazi Party (NSDAP). He became disillusioned with Stresemann's policies upon believing that closer relations with the United States were failing to provide economic benefits, and after his efforts to negotiate a rapprochement with the United Kingdom by pegging the Reichsmark to the pound sterling failed. Beginning in 1929, he increasingly criticized German foreign and financial policy since 1924, and demanded the restoration of Germany's former eastern territories and overseas colonies. Schacht became closer to the Nazis between 1930 and 1932. Though never a member of the NSDAP, Schacht helped to raise funds for the party after meeting with Adolf Hitler. Close for a short time to Heinrich Brüning's government, Schacht shifted to the right by entering the Harzburg Front in October 1931.

Schacht's disillusionment with the existing Weimar government did not indicate a particular shift in his overall philosophy, but rather arose primarily out of two issues:

- his objection to the inclusion of Social Democratic Party elements in the government, and the effect of their various construction and job-creation projects on public expenditures and borrowings (and the consequent undermining of the government's anti-inflation efforts);
- his desire to see Germany retake its place on the international stage, and his recognition that "as the powers became more involved in their own economic problems in 1931 and 1932 [...] a strong government based on a broad national movement could use the existing conditions to regain Germany's sovereignty and equality as a world power."

Schacht believed that if the German government was ever to commence a wholesale reindustrialization and rearmament despite the restrictions imposed by Germany's treaty obligations, it would have to be during a period lacking clear international consensus among the Great Powers.

After the November 1932 elections, in which the NSDAP saw its vote share fall by four percentage points, Schacht and Wilhelm Keppler organized a petition of industrial and financial leaders, the Industrielleneingabe (Industrial petition), requesting president Paul von Hindenburg to appoint Adolf Hitler as Chancellor. After Hitler took power in January 1933, Schacht won re-appointment as Reichsbank president on 17 March.

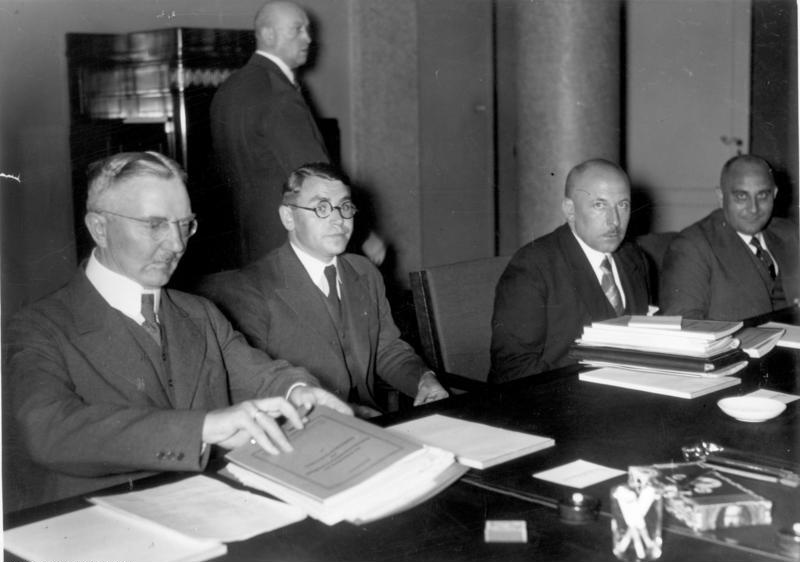
Schacht (left) at a meeting in the Reichsbank transfer commission, 1934

On 2 August 1934, when Reich and Prussian Minister of Economics Kurt Schmitt went on an extended medical leave of absence, Hitler provisionally appointed Schacht to take over the running of the ministries. The appointment was made permanent on 31 January 1935, after Schmitt formally resigned. Schacht supported public-works programs, most notably the construction of autobahnen (highways) to attempt to alleviate unemployment – policies which had been instituted in Germany by Kurt von Schleicher's government in late 1932, and had in turn influenced Franklin D. Roosevelt's New Deal in the United States. But years later, Roosevelt seemed to "enjoy" recalling how Dr. Schacht was "weeping on his [FDR's] desk about his poor country." He also introduced the "New Plan", Germany's attempt to achieve economic "autarky", in September 1934. Germany had accrued a massive foreign currency deficit during the Great Depression, which continued into the early years of Nazi rule. Schacht negotiated several trade agreements with countries in South America and southeastern Europe, under which Germany would continue to receive raw materials, but would pay in Reichsmarks. This ensured that the deficit would not get any worse, while allowing the German government to deal with the gap that had already developed. Schacht also found an innovative solution to the problem of the government deficit by using Mefo bills.

Schacht was also made a member of the Academy for German Law. He was appointed General Plenipotentiary for the War Economy in May 1935 by provision of the Reich Defense Law of 21 May 1935 and was awarded honorary membership in the NSDAP and the Golden Party Badge in January 1937.

Schacht disagreed with what he called "unlawful activities" against Germany's Jewish minority and in August 1935 made a speech denouncing Julius Streicher and Streicher's writing in the Nazi newspaper Der Stürmer.

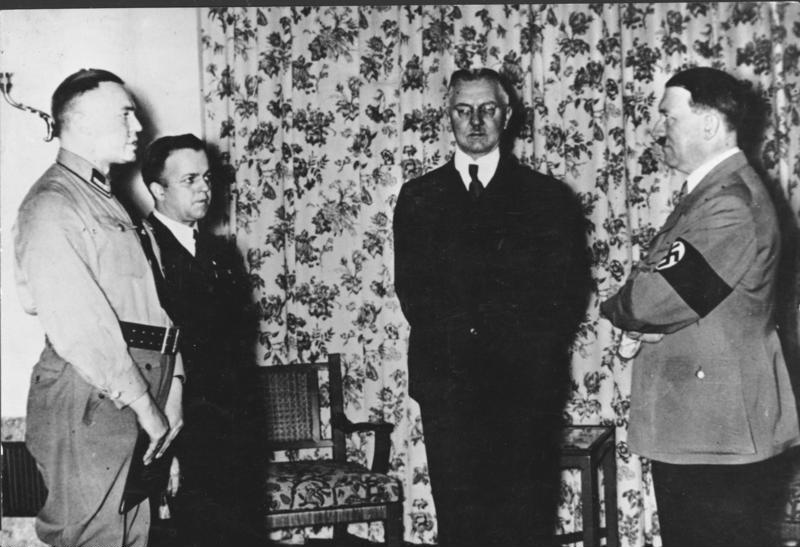
Schacht and Hitler (second and first from right) during a discussion of Germany's economic situation, 1936

During the economic crisis of 1935–1936, Schacht, together with the Price Commissioner Dr. Carl Friedrich Goerdeler, helped lead the "free-market" faction in the German government. They urged Hitler to reduce military spending, turn away from autarkic and protectionist policies, and reduce state control in the economy. Schacht and Goerdeler were opposed by a faction centering on Hermann Göring. Göring was appointed "Plenipotentiary for the Four Year Plan" on 18 October 1936, with broad powers that conflicted with Schacht's authority. Schacht objected to continued high military spending, which he believed would cause inflation, thus coming into conflict with Hitler and Göring.

In 1937, Schacht met with Chinese Finance Minister Dr. H. H. Kung. Schacht told him that "German-Chinese friendship stemmed in good part from the hard struggle of both for independence". Kung said, "China considers Germany its best friend [...] I hope and wish that Germany will participate in supporting the further development of China, the opening up of its sources of raw materials, the upbuilding of its industries and means of transportation."

On 26 November 1937, Schacht resigned as Reich and Prussian Minister of Economics and as General Plenipotentiary at both his and Göring's request. He had grown increasingly dissatisfied with Göring's near-total ignorance of economics, and was also concerned that Germany was coming close to bankruptcy. His replacement was to be Walther Funk, who would take over in February 1938, with Göring serving as acting minister in the interim. Hitler, however, knew that Schacht's departure would raise eyebrows outside Germany, and insisted that he remain in the cabinet as minister without portfolio and as President of the Reichsbank. Göring also appointed him to the Prussian State Council. In the late 1930s, Schacht had an affair with the sculptor Annie Höfken-Hempel. Höfken-Hempel was a Nazi party member and allegedly was a member of the Gestapo. The affair contributed to Schacht's separation from his wife Luise Sowa, an ardent Nazi party member, in late 1938.

Following the Kristallnacht of November 1938, Schacht publicly declared his repugnance at the events and suggested to Hitler that he should use other means if he wanted to be rid of the Jews. He put forward a plan in which Jewish property in Germany would be held in trust, and used as security for loans raised abroad, which would also be guaranteed by the German government. Funds would be made available for Jewish emigrants, to overcome the objections of countries that were hesitant to accept penniless Jews. Hitler accepted the suggestion and authorised him to negotiate with his London contacts. Schacht, in his book The Magic of Money (1967), wrote that Montagu Norman and Lord Bearstead, a prominent Jew, had reacted favourably, but Chaim Weizmann, leading spokesman for the British Zionist Federation, opposed the plan. A component of the plan was that emigrating Jews would have taken items such as machinery with them on leaving the country, as a means of boosting German exports. The similar Haavara Agreement allowing German Jews to emigrate to Mandatory Palestine under similar terms had been signed in 1933.

On 20 January 1939, Hitler dismissed Schacht from his post as President of the Reichsbank and replaced him with Funk. Schacht remained a Reichsminister without portfolio, receiving the same salary, but was excluded from participation in the government. He retired to his house in the country, but continued to occasionally voice private criticisms, culminating in a letter to Göring in November 1942. In it, he assailed the government's decision to begin calling up 15-year-olds for service in the airfield defense forces, and cited this as one more item in a litany of factors that he concluded would strengthen the public's "misgivings as to how this war will actually end". The response to the letter was that Hitler dismissed him as a Reichsminister without portfolio on 22 January 1943, and he was also dismissed from the Prussian State Council by Göring, who cited his "defeatist letter, calculated to undermine the German people's powers of resistance". Another letter from Martin Bormann demanded that Schacht return the Golden Party Badge that he had received in 1937. When Schacht returned to his Berlin home, he found that it was being watched by the Gestapo.

== Resistance activities ==
Schacht was said to be in contact with the German resistance to Nazism as early as 1934, though at that time he still believed the Nazi regime would follow his policies. By 1938, he was disillusioned and was an active participant in the plans for a coup d'état against Hitler if he started a war against Czechoslovakia. Goerdeler, his colleague in 1935–1936, was the civilian leader of resistance to Hitler. Schacht talked frequently with Hans Gisevius, another resistance figure; when resistance organizer Theodor Strünck's house (a frequent meeting place) was bombed out, Schacht allowed Strünck and his wife to live in a villa he owned. However, Schacht had remained in the government and, after 1941, Schacht took no active part in any resistance.

Still, at Schacht's denazification trial (after his acquittal at the Nuremberg trials), it was declared by a judge that "None of the civilians in the resistance did more or could have done more than Schacht actually did."

After the attempt on Hitler's life on 20 July 1944, Schacht was arrested on 23 July. He was sent to Ravensbrück, then to Flossenbürg, and finally to Dachau. In late April 1945, he and about 140 other prominent inmates of Dachau were transferred to Tyrol by the SS, which left them there. They were liberated by the Fifth U.S. Army on 5 May 1945 in Niederdorf, South Tyrol, Dolomites, Italy.

== After the war ==
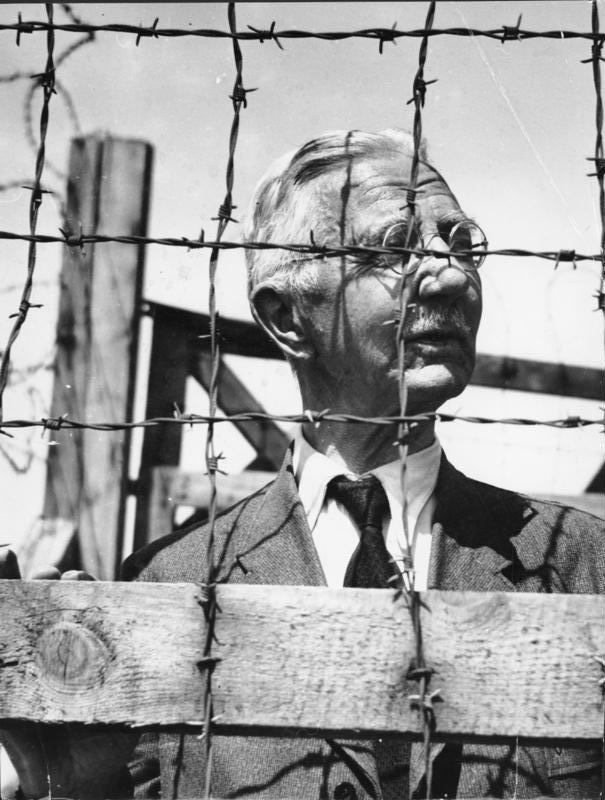
Schacht in an Allied internment camp, 1945

Schacht had supported Hitler's gaining power and had been an important official of the Nazi regime. Thus, he was arrested by the Allies in 1945. He was put on trial at Nuremberg for "conspiracy" and "crimes against peace" (planning and waging wars of aggression), but not war crimes or crimes against humanity. Gustave Gilbert, an American Army psychologist, administered a German version of the Wechsler-Bellevue IQ test on Nazi leaders including Schacht. Schacht scored 143, the highest among the leaders tested, after adjustment upwards to take account of his age.

Schacht pleaded not guilty to the charges against him. He cited in his defense that he had lost all official power before the war even began, that he had been in contact with Resistance leaders like Hans Gisevius throughout the war, and that he had been arrested and imprisoned in a concentration camp himself.

His defenders argued that he was just a patriot trying to make the German economy strong. Furthermore, Schacht was not a member of the NSDAP and shared very little of their ideology. The British judges favored acquittal, while the Soviet judges wanted to convict and execute. The British prevailed, and Schacht was acquitted on 1 October 1946. However, at a West German denazification trial, Schacht was sentenced to eight years of hard labor. He was freed on appeal in 1948.

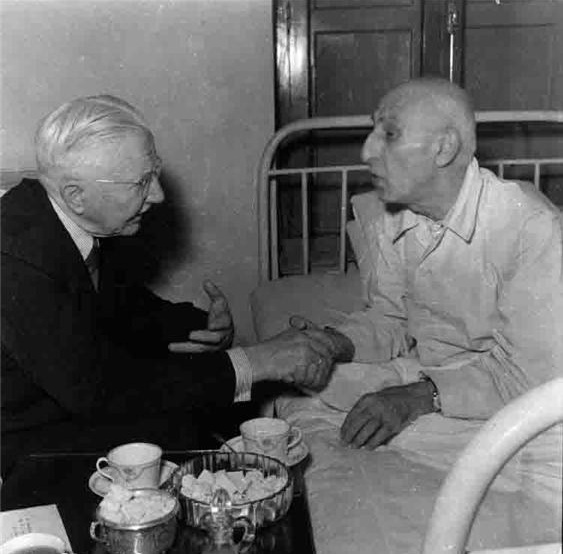
Schacht (left) with Mohammad Mosaddegh of Iran, 1952

In 1950, Juan Yarur Lolas, the Bethlehem-born founder of the Banco de Crédito e Inversiones and president of the Arab colony in Santiago, Chile, tried to hire Schacht as a "financial adviser" in conjunction with the German-Chilean community. However, the plan fell through when it became news. He served as a hired consultant for Aristotle Onassis, a Greek businessman, during the 1950s. He also advised the Indonesian government in 1951 following the invitation of economic minister Sumitro Djojohadikusumo.

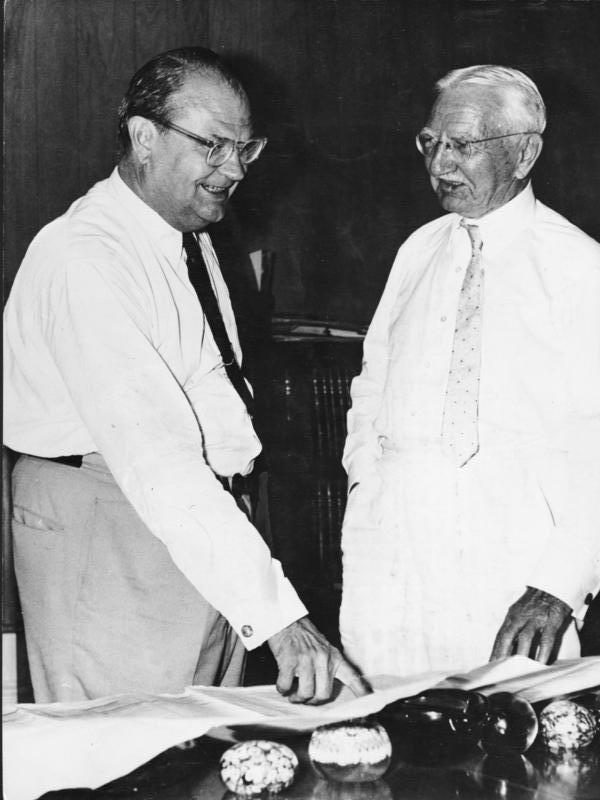
Schacht (right) with Stafford Sands, while visiting the Bahamas in 1962

In 1953, Schacht started a bank, Deutsche Außenhandelsbank Schacht & Co., which he led until 1963. He also advised on economics and finance to heads of state of developing countries, in particular the Non-Aligned countries; however, some of his suggestions were opposed, one of which was in the Philippines by the former Bangko Sentral ng Pilipinas head Miguel Cuaderno, who firmly rebuffed Schacht, stating that his monetary schemes were hardly appropriate for an economy needing capital investment in basic industry and infrastructure.

Indirectly resulting from his founding of the bank, Schacht was the plaintiff in a foundational case in German law on the "general right of personality". A magazine published an article criticizing Schacht, containing several incorrect statements. Schacht first requested that the magazine publish a correction, and when the magazine refused, he sued the publisher for violation of his personality rights. The district court found the publisher both civilly and criminally liable; on appeal, the appellate court reversed the criminal conviction, but found that the publisher had violated Schacht's general right of personality.

Schacht had a daughter and a son from his first marriage, Inge and Jens, and two daughters from his second marriage, Konstanze and Cordula. He died in Munich, West Germany, on 3 June 1970.

== Works ==
Schacht wrote numerous works during his lifetime, of which at least six books have been translated into English:

- The Stabilisation of the Mark. Translated by Butler, Ralph. London: Allen & Unwin. 1927.
  - The Stabilization of the Mark (Reprint). New York: Arno Press. 1979. ISBN 0-405-11246-7 – via Internet Archive.
- The End of Reparations. Translated by Gannett, Lewis. New York: J. Cape & H. Smith. 1931 – via Internet Archive.
- Account Settled. Translated by Fitzgerald, Edward. London: Weidenfeld & Nicolson. 1949 – via Internet Archive. (Originally titled Abrechnung mit Hitler, written during the Nuremberg trials.)
- Gold for Europe. Translated by Stern-Rubarth, Edgar. London: Gerald Duckworth & Co. 1950.
- My First Seventy-Six Years: The Autobiography of Hjalmar Schacht. Translated by Pyke, Diana. London: Allan Wingate. 1955 – via Internet Archive. (The Internet Archive also has a freely accessible black-and-white copy.)
  - American edition: Confessions of "The Old Wizard": The Autobiography of Hjalmar Horace Greeley Schacht. Translated by Pyke, Diana. Boston: Houghton Mifflin Company. 1956 – via Internet Archive.
- The Magic of Money. Translated by Erskine, Paul. London: Oldbourne. 1967 – via Internet Archive.

== Portrayal in popular culture ==
Hjalmar Schacht has been portrayed by the following actors in film, television, and theater productions:

- Felix Basch in the 1943 United States propaganda film Mission to Moscow.
- Władysław Hańcza in the 1971 Polish film Epilog norymberski.
- James Bradford in the 2000 Canadian/U.S. television miniseries Nuremberg.
- Stoyan Aleksiev in the 2006 British television series Nuremberg: Nazis on Trial.

== See also ==
- Secret Meeting of 20 February 1933
