= New Gallery =

New Gallery may refer to:

- Neue Galerie New York, a museum of German art in New York
- New Gallery (London), a 19th-century gallery in London
- New Gallery (Kassel), an art museum in Kassel, Germany
- New Gallery of Fine Art, a short-lived art gallery in Adelaide, South Australia, set up by Voitre Marek in 1953
- The New Gallery, an art centre in Calgara, Alberta, Canada
