= Paul Ehrhardt =

German painter (1888-1981)

Paul Ehrhardt (August 2, 1888, in Magdeburg – 1981 in Lippstadt) was a German painter.

== Life ==
Born on August 2, 1888, in Magdeburg, he spent his early life in Berlin and Alvensleben/Magdeburg. In 1910/11 he went to Bremerhaven to learn the profession of a mechanic. During WWI he served at the Westfront, an experience which deeply impacted him. After the War in 1919, Paul Ehrhardt settled in the Westphalian city Osnabrück. He found employment in the Osnabrücker Kupfer- und Drahtwerk for about seven years. In this time he worked on that war experience with some charcoal drawings. Also rare at that time, he created interior views of the factory, and its workers. At that time he had contact with the Berliner painter and etcher Julius C. Turner (1881–1948) who is also known for his industrial interiors. Turner established also a contact to Käthe Kollwitz who exhibited at that time in Osnabrück.

With the help of a stipend of the city of Osnabrück, he was able to study from 1929 for about two years at the Kunsthochschule Kassel under professor Curt Witte (1882–1959), its director from 1925 to 1932. In Kassel Ehrhardt continued not only the study of portraits and academic nudes, but also of industrial interiors. While the city directory of Osnabrück of 1928/9 registers him as a mechanic, he is called in the directory of 1930 as 'art painter'. From the 1930s on, a large oeuvre of him survived mostly in private collections, showing his popularity and his success among his buyers. He was now able to support his family with his art work.

His main subjects are local views of Osnabrück, cityscapes, streets, the Halster Mill, but also landscapes of the Harz, views at the port of Hamburg, and Rothenburg ob der Tauber. He still was interested in industrial interiors. The Georgsmarienhütte, the steel mill south of Osnabrück, became his favourite subject. Coming himself from a mechanics' background his paintings of the steel mill stand out at that time, and were compared in a 1989 exhibition with Adolph Menzel. In his concentration on architecture, landscape and lighting, he created a timeless atmosphere in his paintings. His artwork thrived in a milieu where an oil painting belonged to the pre-requisites of a German middle class home.

After WWII and the destruction of large swaths of Osnabrück and other German cities, he re-gained popularity among his customers in the 1950s. They cherished the timelessness and his historical views of Osnabrück and other sites, depicting a peaceful pre-war era gone forever. When tastes in art and middle class life style changed in the 1960s and 1970s, his traditional customer base vanished and he became almost forgotten.

An exhibition in 1989 in Osnabrück re-discovered him as an important regional painter of the mid-century, who recorded with a keen eye Osnabrück and its region.

== Bibliography ==
Myller, Sabine: Paul Ehrhardt. Eine Ausstellung des kulturgeschichtlichen Museums und des Museums- und Kunstvereins Osnabrück 10. September - 8. Oktober 1989 (Osnabrücker Kunst und Künstler im Akzisehaus), Osnabrück 1989.
