= Annie Höfken-Hempel =

German sculptor (1899–1965)

- Born: Anna Else Helene Lisbeth Hempel; 18 May 1899; Hanover, Province of Hanover, Kingdom of Prussia
- Died: 9 October 1965 (aged 66); Trier, Rhineland-Palatinate, West Germany
- Education: Kunsthochschule Kassel
- Spouse: Erich Julius Höfken (m. 1922)
- Awards: Order of Merit of the Kingdom of Hungary, Knights Cross, 1942

Anna "Annie" Else Helene Lisbeth Höfken-Hempel (née Hempel; 18 May 1899 – 9 October 1965) was a German sculptor who specialised in wood and metal sculptures. An active participant in the visual culture of the Nazi regime, Höfken-Hempel created busts of key Nazi officials including Hitler, Göring and Goebbels.

== Early life and education ==
Anna Else Helene Lisbeth Hempel was born 18 May 1899 (Note: Also cited as 1900.) in Hanover, Kingdom of Prussia (present-day, Germany) to Kurt Gottfried Friedrich Wilhelm Hempel and Marie Johanne Amalie Hempel. Höfken-Hempel studied at the Kunsthochschule Kassel, after which she undertook study trips to Italy, Greece, Spain, Anatolia, Egypt, and France. In 1920s, Höfken-Hempel settled in Trier.

== Career ==
Specialising in wooden and metal bust portraits, Höfken-Hempel's work focused on depictions of women and the mother and child. On 1 August 1932, Höfken-Hempel joined the Nazi Party and was allegedly a member of the Gestapo. Höfken-Hempel actively participate in the visual culture of the regime, creating busts of key Nazi officials including Hitler, Göring, Goebbels, Rosenberg and Schacht (with whom she had an affair).

In 1937, Höfken-Hempel exhibited at Exposition Internationale des Arts et Techniques dans la Vie Moderne, for which she received a gold medal. The same year Höfken-Hempel exhibited "Mutter und Kind" at the Große Deutsche Kunstausstellung. In autumn 1940, Höfken-Hempel contacted Emil Georg Bührle and offered to create busts of him and his wife, Charlotte Schalk. Staying with the Bührle family for a number of months, the busts where later exhibited at the Kunsthaus Zürich in 1942.

In 1942, Höfken-Hempel was awarded the Knight's Cross of the Order of Merit of the Kingdom of Hungary. Between 1942 and 1943, Höfken-Hempel was involved in a project by Gustav Simon to redesign the gardens of the Electoral Palace in Koblenz. The project, which involved the destruction of the Thingspiele situated in the Palace's gardens and the creation of fountain by Höfken-Hempel, was scrapped by autumn 1943 due to intense bombing.

In 1961, Höfken-Hempel created a mahogany bust of Dwight D. Eisenhower on behalf of the West German government.

== Personal life ==
On 22 April 1922, Höfken-Hempel married Erich Julius Höfken, a physician, with whom she had one child.

In the late 1930s, Höfken-Hempel had an affair with Hjalmar Schacht. The affair contributed to Schacht's separation from his wife, Luise Sowa, in late 1938.
