= Wilhelm Schmidthild =

German painter, graphic artist, illustrator & art professor (1876–1951)

Wilhelm Schmidthild (born Wilhelm Schmidt; January 30, 1876 – January 30, 1951) was a German painter, graphic artist, illustrator and art professor. He chose as his field detailed documentation as an illustrator for botanical and zoological reference books and free compositions in the tradition of realism. He is also known as Schmidt-Hild.

== Life and education ==
Schmidthild was born in Hildesheim on January 30, 1876, into a Protestant family and baptised Karl Friedrich Wilhelm. His father was a train conductor.

After high school he studied at the teachers workshop in Northeim, at the Kunstgewerbeschule in Hannover and at the Kunstakademie Kassel, at professor Louis Kolitz, to become an art teacher. He started his professional career at elementary schools in Hannover and Hildesheim and finally became a teacher for the public service in 1896.

Schmidthild continued practicing his skills during the years: in 1911 he took an exam as a drawing teacher. and worked from that on as a high school art teacher. In addition he took courses at the private painting school of Walter Thor in Munich.

In 1919 he ended school teaching to work as an artist and part-time private professor.

== Development and excursions ==
In 1909, he went on a study trip to Sweden and Denmark. From 1919, he worked at the secondary school in the town of Barth, Germany. Schmidthild produced a large variety of paintings, sketches and illustrations with local reference such as landscapes, animals and maritime scenes of Mecklenburg.

Schmidthild repeated his study trips and longer excursions to Argentina and Brazil (1919), Mecklenburg (1924), Neuburg am Inn (1925) and to Halle (Saale) and Italy at the Lake Garda, Venice, Verona und Bolzano (1926). By that time his drawing style became influenced by Art Nouveau movement.

In 1927 Schmidthild became drawing teacher at Ernestinum high school in Rinteln. There he developed various vedute with a local reference and illustrations (colored drypoint) for specialised books, for example the zoologists Carl Floericke and Walter Heimroth, 1929 und 1930.

He changed his name from Schmidt into Schmidthild (sometimes written Schmidt-Hild), a reference to his birth city of Hildesheim.

From 1931 to his retirement in 1938, he taught as an art professor at the Staatliche Zeichenakademie in Hanau. In the same year he took part at the Große Deutsche Kunstausstellung in Munich as well an in exhibitions in Berlin and Darmstadt. He died on January 30, 1951, in Peine.

== Work and exhibitions ==
Schmidthild has been experimenting with a variety of materials and techniques: sketching with pencil, chalk or charcoal, oil paintings or etching. In his time he was a well renowned expert by museums and specialist printers, such as Westermann publishing, for depictions of animals, especially exotic birds and plants.

His artwork was represented by Amsler & Ruthardt gallery in Berlin.

Schmidthild was invited to the Große Deutsche Kunstaustellung in 1941, 1942, 1943 and 1944

== Impact ==
During his lifetime Schmidthild's work gained attention by scientific-botanical experts. Therefore, today his paintings can be found in museums of natural history or municipal museums such as the Naturhistorisches Museum (Braunschweig), Municipal Museum of Szczecin, the collection of the city of Rinteln, Homberg, Barth and at the Letter Foundation.

Two etchings are in the collection of the University of Giessen.

The Kreismuseum Bitterfeld owns an etching showing a lady in art nouveau style

A large number of his works were brought to the US by American soldiers returning home in the late 1940s.
