= August Bromeis =

German painter

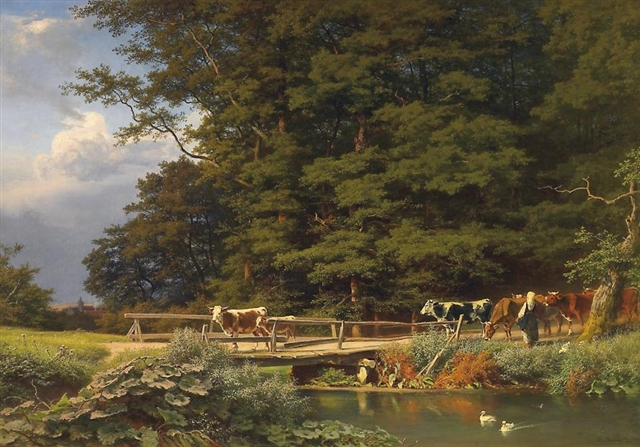
Bringing the cattle home

August Bromeis (1813–1881) was a German landscape painter. He was born at Wilhelmshöhe He first studied in the academy of his native town, then in Munich from 1831 to 1833, in which year he went to Rome, where he was much influenced by the style of J. A. Koch. Bromeis returned to Germany in 1848, and resided at Frankfurt am Main and Düsseldorf, and at Kassel, where he was made Instructor and Professor of Painting at the Academy in 1867. He died in Kassel in 1881. His most successful pictures were idealized landscapes, for example:

- The Campagna at Rome (in the Town Gallery at Cassel).
- Italian Landscape, 1869 (in the National Gallery at Berlin)
- The Grave of Archimedes in Sicily.
- Stormy Landscape.
- Forest near Düsseldorf.

He is associated with the Düsseldorf school of painting.

== See also ==
- List of German painters
