= Miao Xiaochun =

Chinese artist and photographer (born 1964)

Miao Xiaochun (Chinese: 缪晓春; pinyin: Miào Xiǎochūn, born 1964, in Wuxi, Jiangsu, China) is an artist and photographer based in Beijing.

== Life ==
Miao Xiaochun was born in Wuxi, Jiangsu Province. In 1986 he received his bachelor's degree and graduated from Nanjing University. In 1989 Miao graduated from the Central Academy of Fine Arts in Beijing, China and from Kassel Academy of Fine Arts in Germany in 1999 for two master's degrees. Until now he is teaching Art Photography and Digital Media at the Central Academy of Fine Arts.

He is best known for his large scale photographs, often assembled panoramas, of modern Chinese cityscapes. His signature element is the presence of "He", a figure in ancient Chinese scholar costume. Other works include computer graphics installations such as The Last Judgement in Cyberspace, a 3D monochrome reworking of Michelangelo's The Last Judgment from the Sistine Chapel replacing every figure with a virtual model of Miao himself.

Miao Xiaochun is considered one of the most representative and influential artists In the domain of China’s new media art. He started in 90s his creative explorations on the interface between the real and the virtual. His extensive body of work includes photography, painting and 3D computer animation which are parallel to each other. He works in contemporary photography based on the “multiple view point” perspective to pioneer connections between history and the modern world.

Miao Xiaochun successfully uses 3D technology to create upon a 2D image a virtual 3D scene, to transform a still canvas into moving images, concurrently changing the traditional way of viewing paintings and giving a completely new interpretation and significance to a masterpiece of art, especially with the striking use of his idiosyncratic imagination about history and the future. His works add an important example to contemporary negotiations with art history, and open up new potential for art as he experiments with new possibilities, taking a step forward into new potential spheres.

His photographic and 3D animation works such as The Last Judgment in Cyberspace, H2O, Microcosm, Restart and Disillusion as well as his digital ink painting series "Beijing Handscroll"are worldwide exhibited.

2011

Out of Body, White Box Museum of Art, 798 Beijing;

Beijing Handscrolls, Guardini Foundation, Berlin, Germany;

MIAO XIAOCHUN, Galeria Arsenał w Białymstoku, Poland

2010

Macromania, Ludwig Museum, Koblenz, Germany;

Miao Xiaochun—Two Big Video Works, Today Art Museum, Beijing;

Recent Works by Miao Xiaochun, Arario Gallery, Seoul

2009

Index, White Space Beijing and Alexander Ochs Galleries Berlin|Beijing, Beijing;

Microcosm, Arario Gallery, Beijing-New York

2008

The Last Judgment in Cyberspace, Museum of Contemporary Religious Art, St. Louis, MO, USA

2007

The Last Judgment in Cyberspace, Contemporary Art Centre of South Australia, Australia;

H2O—A Study of Art History, Osage Contemporary Art and Ideas, Hong Kong

2006

Urban Landscape, John Hope Franklin Centre of Duke University, USA;

A Birdview, Zhu Qizhan Art Museum, Shanghai, China;

The Last Judgment in Cyberspace, Walsh Gallery, Chicago

2004

Phantasmagoria—Photographs by Miao Xiaochun, Walsh Gallery, Chicago

2002

Linger, Galerie Urs Meile, Lucerne, Switzerland

2001

From East to West and Back to East, Museum of CAFA, Beijing, China

1999

Kulturbegegnungen, Galerie Stellwerk, Kassel

1994

Miao Xiaochun, Beijing Art Museum and Shanghai Art Museum

1992

Miao Xiaochun, National Museum of Chinese History, Beijing

1991

Miao Xiaochun: Recents Works, Beijing Art Museum

1988

Miao Xiaochun’s Paintings, Gallery of CAFA, Beijing

== Group exhibitions ==
2013

55th Venice Biennale, The Chinese Pavilion, Venice, Italy

Move on Asia-Video Art 2002 to 2012, ZKM, Karlshure, Germany

Nothing to declare? – World Maps of Art since 89, Academy of the Arts Berlin, Germany

2012

The World of Soul: As Virtual Artistic Engineering, First Shenzhen Independent Animation Biennale, B10 Art Center, Shenzhen

The 7th Asia-Pacific Triennial of Contemporary Art- Mountains and Waters: Chinese Animation Since the 1930s, Queensland Art Gallery l Gallery of Modern Art, Brisbane, Australia

Conceptual Renewal – Short History of Chinese Contemporary Photographical Art, Si Shang Art Museum, Beijing

Chinese Contemporary Public Art, Kassel, Germany

The Unseen, Main Exhibition of The 4th Guangzhou Triennial, Guangdong Museum of Art, Guangzhou, China

Transformation: A View on Chinese Contemporary Art, Istanbul Modern, Istanbul, Turkey

Architecture China-The 100 Contemporary Projects, Reiss-EngelhornMuseen(REM), Mannheim, Germany

Go figure! Contemporary Chinese Portraiture, National Portrait Gallery and The Sherman Contemporary Art Foundation, Canberra and Sydney, Australia

Height, The First Xinjiang Contemporary Art Biennale, Ürümqi International Exhibition Center

Whatever You Want—New Media Show, Kara Kitchen, Beijing, China

ARSENALE 2012, The 1st Kyiv International Biennial of Contemporary Art, Kyiv, Ukraine

Photo España—Image Anxiety, Fundación Telefónica, Madrid, Spain

Future Pass, Wereldmuseum, Rotterdam, Netherlands; Taiwan Museum of Fine Arts, Taichung, Taiwan; Today Art Museum, Beijing, China

Beijing Index, Digital Art Museum, Art Beijing 2012

2011

The Global Contemporary. Kunstwelten nach 1989(Art Worlds after 1989), ZKM, Germany

The 54th Venice Biennale—Future Pass, Venice, Italy

Limitless, Arario Gallery, Beijing

New Horizon—Contemporary Chinese Art, The National Museum of Australia, Canberra, Australia

Meta-Question Back to The Museum Per Se, Inauguration Exhibition of The 4th Guangzhou Triennial, Guangdong Museum of Art, Guangzhou, China

30 Years of Contemporary Chinese Art—Moving image in China 1988-2011, Minsheng Art Museum, Shanghai

Spectrum, Chinese Independent Animation, A4 Contemporary Arts Center, Chengdu, China

Verso Est. Chinese Architectural Landscapes, MAXXI, Rome, Italy

Representation of Realistic Art—The 5th Chengdu Biennale 2011, Chengdu Contemporary Art Museum, Chengdu, China

Move on Asia - The End of Video Art, Casa Asia, Barcelona, Spain

New Age, New Media, exhibition tour in Ten Cities of China and Australia

“Dual senses" and "Dynamic views”— Contemporary Art Exhibition across the Taiwan Straits of 2011, NAMOC, Beijing; Taiwan Museum of Fine Arts(TMOA)

A Decade of the Rabbit, White Rabbit Museum, Sydney, Australia Magic Spaces, Today Art Museum, Beijing, China

2010

A Fresh Look at Chinese Landscapes, Galerie Moderne Chinesische Malerei des Museums für Asiatische Kunst, Berlin, Germany

Mediators, The National Museum in Warsaw, Warsaw, Poland

Negotiations—The Second Today's Documents, Today Art Museum, Beijing, China

Made in Korea, China and Japan(Made in Pop Land), National Museum of Contemporary Art, Korea

Reshaping History—Chinart from 2000-2009, National Conference Center, Beijing, China

DIGIFESTA—Speed of Earth ‘2010 km/second, see’, Gwangju Museum of Art, Korea

2009

Beijing Time, Casa Asia, Matadero Madrid; Santiago Art Museum, Spain

Guangzhou Photo Biennial, Guangdong Museum of Art, Guangzhou, China

Animamix Biennial: Metaphors of Un/real, MoCa Shanghai, China

Open Vision—Chinese Contemporary Art, Czech National Gallery, Prague

Next Nature, National Gallery of Indonesia, Jakarta, Indonesia

Vistas | Vision of U-City, Incheon International Digital Art Festival, Incheon, Korea

Nature | Nation, Museum on the Seam | Social-Political Contemporary Art Museum, Jerusalem, Israel

The Dream Machine, The Niterói Contemporary Art Museum, Rio de Janeiro, Brazil

Spectacle—to Each His Own, Museum of Contemporary Art, Taipei

2008

Images in the night, Le Grand Palais, Paris, France

Expenditure, Busan Biennale, Busan MoMA, Korea

Up: Chinese Contemporary Art, Singapore Art Museum

Mediations, Poznan Biennale, Poland

China: Construction—Deconstruction, Museu de Arte de São Paulo, Brazil

Go China—New World Order, Present day Installation Art and Photography, Groninger Museum, Groningen, the Netherlands

Re-Imagining Asia, The House of World Cultures, Berlin, Germany; The New Art Gallery Walsall, Walsall, UK

China Design Now, 2008-2010, Victoria and Albert Museum, London, UK; Cincinnati Art Museum, Ohio, USA; Portland Museum of Art, Oregon, USA

China Gold, Museum Maillol, Paris, France

Synthetic Times: Media Art China 2008—International Media Art Exhibition, National Art Museum of China, Beijing

55 Days in Valencia, Institut Valencia d’Art Modern, Spain

2007

China—Facing Reality, Museum of Modern Art Ludwig Foundation Vienna, Austria; National Art Museum of China, Beijing

China Now, Cobra Museum of Modern Art, Amstelveen, the Netherlands

Energy: Spirit • Body • Material—1st Today’s Documents, Today Art Museum, Beijing

Red Hot: Contemporary Asian Art Rising, Museum of Fine Arts, Houston, Texas, USA

Floating—New Generation of Art in China, National Museum of Contemporary Art, Korea

Thermocline of Art-New Asian Waves, ZKM Karlsruhe, Germany

New Directions from China: China New Media Art, Plug.in, Basel, Switzerland

Contemporary Photography from China. Zhuyi! China!, ARTIUM, Centro-Museo Vasco de Arte Contemporaneo; Palau de la Virreina, Barcelona, Spain

Made in China, Louisiana Museum of Modern Art, Denmark; Israel Museum, Jerusalem, Israel

2006

Media City Seoul 2006, The 4th Seoul International Media Art Biennale, Korea

SUSI: Key to Chinese Art Today, Metropolitan Museum, Manila, the Philippines

China now—Art at a time of transformation, Essl Museum, Austria Totalstadt: Beijing case, ZKM Karlsruhe, Germany

New Urban Reality: Chinese Contemporary Art, Museum Boijmans Van Beuningen, Rotterdam, the Netherlands

2005

Scapes: The Century and Paradise, 2nd Chengdu Biennale, China

Mahjong—Contemporary Chinese Art from the Sigg Collection, 2005-2009, Art Museum Bern, Switzerland; Hamburger Kunsthalle, Germany; Museum der Moderne Salzburg, Austria;UC Berkeley Art Museum & Pacific Film Archive(BAM & PFA), Berkeley, California, USA; The Peabody Essex Museum, Salem, Massachusetts, USA

Re-Viewing the City, Guangzhou Photo Biennial, Guangdong Museum of Art, China

2004

Between Past and Future—New Photography and Video from China, 2004-2006, International Center of Photography and Asia Society, New York, USA; Smart Museum of Art and Museum of Contemporary Art, Chicago, USA; Seattle Art Museum, Seattle, USA; Victoria and Albert Museum, London, UK; Haus der Kulturen der Welt, Berlin, Germany

Spellbound Aura—The new vision of Chinese Photography, Museum of Contemporary Art, Taipei

2003

Me and More, Museum of Art Lucerne, Switzerland

Encounter, Museum of CAFA, Beijing; Liu Haisu Museum, Shanghai, China

Left hand, right handA Sino German Exhibition of Contemporary Art, 798 Art Space, Beijing, China

2002

Urban Creation, The 4th Shanghai Biennale 2002, Shanghai Art Museum, Shanghai, China

Media City Seoul 2002, The 2nd Seoul International Media Art Biennale, Korea

China—Tradition and Modern, Ludwig Museum, Oberhausen, Germany

Golden Harvest—Chinese Contemporary Art, Museum of Contemporary Art, Zagreb, Croatia

1991

The First Annual Exhibition of Chinese Oil Paintings, The National Museum of Chinese History, Beijing, China
