= Richard Koch (Reichsbank) =

German judge and Director

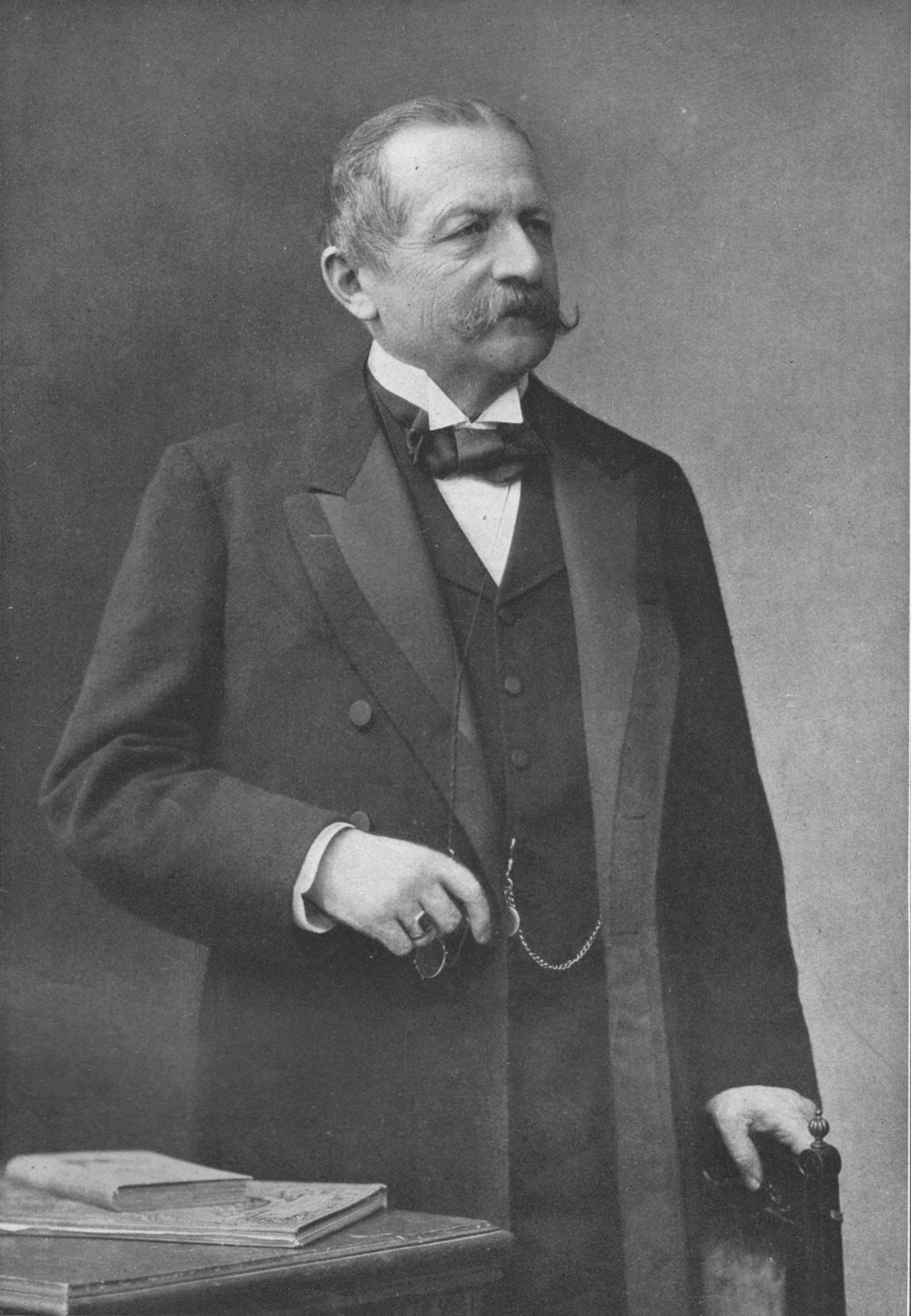
- Richard Koch, c. 1907
- Born: September 15, 1834; Cottbus, Germany
- Died: October 15, 1910 (aged 76); Berlin
- Education: Humboldt University of Berlin
- Occupations: Judge and business leader
- Known for: President of the Reichsbank from 1890 to 1908

Richard Eduard Koch, known as von Koch from 1908 onward (born 15 September 1834 in Cottbus; died 15 October 1910 in Berlin), was a German jurist and judge and served as president of the Reichsbank from 1890 to 1908.

== Early life ==
Koch began studying law at the University of Berlin in 1850. He entered the Prussian judicial service in Cottbus in 1853 and became a court assessor in 1858.

== Career ==
From 1859 he worked as an assistant judge at the appellate courts in Ratibor and Halberstadt, from 1862 as a judge at the Danzig City and District Court, and from 1865 as a judge at the Berlin City Court. In June 1867, he was appointed Stadtgerichtsrat (city court councillor). In 1868 he became secretary to the North German Confederation's commission on a common code of civil procedure. With Johannes Struckmann, he published a commentary on the new code in 1877; its ninth edition appeared in 1910.

Koch joined the Bank of Prussia's directorate in October 1870 and became a member and legal counsel in March 1871. He helped prepare its conversion into the Reichsbank and joined the new bank's directorate when it opened on 1 January 1876. He was vice president from 1887 to 1890 and succeeded Hermann von Dechend as president on 23 May 1890. During his presidency, the number of Reichsbank branches rose from 242 in 1890 to 469 in 1906, while annual turnover increased from 108.6 to 279 billion marks.

He defended the gold standard, extended the bank's giro and clearing systems, chaired the 1892-1893 Stock Exchange Inquiry Commission, and helped draft the German cheque law enacted in 1908.

== Recognition ==
In August 1886, Heidelberg University awarded Koch an honorary doctorate (Dr. jur. h. c.). In 1891, he was appointed Crown Syndic, an office that carried lifetime membership of the Prussian House of Lords. In August 1893, he was appointed a full privy councillor (Wirklicher Geheimer Rat), and in 1903 he became an honorary citizen of his birthplace.

German Reichsbank notes issued from 1891 to 1907 bear his signature. When he retired in 1908, he was raised to the nobility.

Koch published lectures and essays on civil procedure, commercial law, currency, banking, and the law of bills of exchange.

== Death ==
Richard von Koch died in Berlin in 1910 at the age of 76 and was buried at the Old St. Matthew's Churchyard in Schöneberg. The grave no longer exists.

== Literature ==
- Manfred Pohl (1980). "Koch, Richard". Neue Deutsche Biographie (in German). Vol. 12. Berlin: Duncker & Humblot. pp. 273–274. (full text online).
- Jacob Riesser: Richard Koch und die Reichsbank. In: Die Grenzboten, vol. 70, no. 14, 1911, pp. 11-23. (in German)
- Reichsbank: Die Reichsbank 1876 bis 1910: Organisation und Geschäftsverkehr statistisch dargestellt. Reichsdruckerei, Berlin 1912. (in German)
- Manfred Seeger: Die Politik der Reichsbank von 1876-1914 im Lichte der Spielregeln der Goldwährung. Duncker & Humblot, Berlin 1968, ISBN 978-3-428-02178-9. (in German)
- Hans-Hermann Krönert: Dr. Richard Koch. In: Lausitzer Rundschau, 14 October 2005 (online edition, with photograph)
