= Kunsthochschule Kassel =

Coordinates: 51°18′15″N 9°29′21″E

- Kunsthochschule Kassel
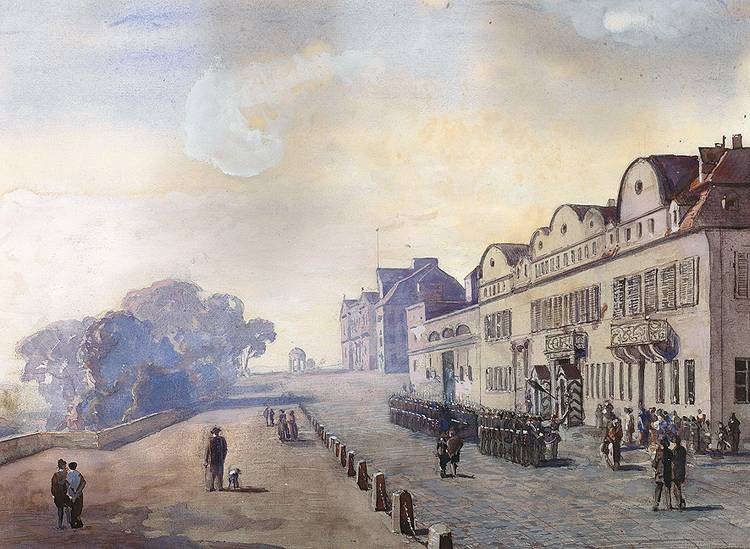
- First site of the University in Schloss Bellevue
- Former names: Kassel Art Academy
- Type: Public university
- Established: 1777; 249 years ago
- Affiliations: University of Kassel
- Location: Kassel, Hesse, Germany
- Website: http://www.kunsthochschule-kassel.de

Kunsthochschule Kassel (German; "Kassel College of Art") is a college of fine arts in Kassel, Germany. Founded in 1777, it is a semi-autonomous department of the University of Kassel.

== History ==
=== Kassel Art Academy ===
After the Seven Years' War (1756 to 1763), Frederick II, Landgrave of Hesse-Cassel, began establishing industry and manufacturing in Hesse and brought artists and scholars to Kassel. On October 18, 1777, he separated the “Académie de Peinture et de Sculpture de Cassel” from the Collegium Carolinum and opened the Fridericianum in 1779 as one of the first public museums on the European continent. In the same year, the academy received its first statutes, in which the role of promoting art outweighed that of teaching. The co-founder and teacher of painting was Johann Heinrich Tischbein (1772–1789).

The change to an art school took place in 1838 after responsibility for the academy was transferred to the government in 1832. Towards the end of the 19th century, academic teaching became increasingly separated from training in commercial art. A separate arts and crafts school was created. The main aspects here were the training to become an art teacher and the introduction of the first workshops.

Together with the Stuttgart Art Academy, female students were officially admitted at the beginning of the 20th century in limited teaching and separate classes. In the 1920s, the academy also introduced workshops in order to do justice to the increasing importance of craftsmanship in art. The Prussian government's attempt to merge the academy and the arts and crafts school failed. In 1931 the academy was officially closed due to austerity measures. Only one class for painting with Kay Nebel continued. In 1935, the Reich Ministry of Science, Education and Public Education (REM) set up a scholarship program for young talent in National Socialist art in Berlin. This program was led by Kay Nebel and Ludwig Thormaehlen (Kassel State Museum). In the period between 1933 and 1944, the school changed its name several times and the staff was significantly reduced. It continued to exist as a “state crafts school”, “master school for German crafts”, and as a “master school for creative crafts”, but was downgraded to a technical school. In 1943 the building and furnishings were destroyed in an air raid. The school's files were also destroyed. Classes were stopped on May 1, 1944. The temporary end of the institution, which had last operated under the name “Kassel State Master School”, finally came with the dismissal of the acting senior director of studies, Bruno Beneke, on January 6, 1946 at the instigation of the military government.

=== New foundation and comprehensive university in Kassel ===
After the war, the arts and crafts school was reopened in 1946 under the name “School for Crafts and Art”, later “Werkkunstschule”, and in 1947 the academy was reopened under the name “Werkakademie”. This became the “State University of Fine Arts” in 1960. Thanks to the protected position of the professor and documenta founder Arnold Bode, after his success in 1962, expansion took place through the didactic interpretation of practice and application within the Kassel school. During this time, the Werkkunstschule gained a good reputation under director Jupp Ernst. In 1962 she moved into a new building by Paul Friedrich Posenenske on the edge of Karlsaue. In 1968 the state university followed in an immediately neighboring building. Two years later, the so-called “College of Fine Arts” merged.

In 1971, the Kassel Comprehensive University was founded and all university-like facilities in Kassel and Witzenhausen were integrated into the new university. Initially, in the founding phase, the organizational units 04 Gestalt Theory, 05 Painting/Sculpture, 06 Architecture/Landscape Architecture, 07 Graphic Design, 08 Industrial Design and 09 Art Studies emerged from the “College of Fine Arts”. In 1977, the OE Architecture/Landscape Architecture moved from Karlsaue to Holländischer Platz. This heralded the separation of architecture from the other artistic/design subjects, although some areas of architecture remained at Karlsaue until the end of the 1990s.

In the development phase, departments were formed from the organizational units in 1978: FB 10 Art and FB 11 Design (as of the SS 1979 course catalog). The OE Architecture/Landscape Architecture has already been merged with the OE Architecture of the former technical college (the engineering school) and the FB 12 Architecture and the FB 13 Urban Planning, Landscape Planning emerged from the OE Architecture, Urban Planning, Landscape Planning. These two departments went to the Kassel University as Study Area I and later to the University of Kassel as FB 06 ASL – Architecture, Urban planning, landscape planning outside of art school. This meant that the artistic/design area lost the landscape/architecture, even if interdisciplinary collaboration continued for a long time.

During this time, the Technical Center was founded as an interdisciplinary unit that brings together workshops and laboratories primarily for students of artistic and design courses. The “HbK” still existed in the old buildings on Karlsaue, while the growing comprehensive university filled several locations and the new, central campus on Holländischer Platz.

The university stood out over the years as a “college of fine arts” thanks to its experimentalism, particularly in architecture and openness. The protagonist of this phase is the “earth building pope” Gernot Minke, who aggressively succeeded in combining targeted discussion and applied practice. Eberhard Fiebig was also a representative of this phase until the late 1980s. During this time, the school developed its own, integrated system of presentation and communication. Nevertheless, Lucius Burckhardt, socio-economist and urban planner, who cultivated open space and walking sciences for many years, is a representative of this time, although he belongs to the Department of Architecture, urban planning, landscape planning.

In the summer semester of 1980, the artistic/design area was reorganized into three departments: FB 22 Art, FB 23 Visual Communication and FB 24 Product Design (initially counting FB 10/1–3). This structure was maintained for 20 years, until the late 1990s.

=== University and path to art school ===
In the 1990s, the Kassel University of Applied Sciences moved from the development phase to the consolidation phase. This was accompanied by tight funding, which fell short of expectations, particularly in the area of positions. The university management now focused on concentrating the departments. At the same time, the discussion about profile creation and representation of universities began in the higher education sector. The Kassel Comprehensive University (GHK) initially changed its name to the University-Comprehensive University of Kassel (UGK) in 1993 and later to the University of Kassel in 2003. The artistic departments wanted to be able to better represent and assert themselves as an art college in Kassel. At the end of the 90s, a commission was set up to prepare the Kassel Art School. Finally, in 2000, the departments 22 art (fine arts, art studies, art education), 23 visual communication and 24 product design were combined to form department 20 as a semi-autonomous department. This was granted the right to a rector. The official name was “Kassel School of Art at the University of Kassel”. Reiner Kallhardt became the founding rector, Karin Stempel was elected as the first female rector in 2004, followed by Christian Philipp Müller in 2011. In 2013, Joel Baumann became rector of the art school, followed by Martin Schmidl in November 2021.

== Study ==
Kunsthochschule Kassel (KhK) offers academic programs in the areas of fine arts, design, art education, and art history. The institution follows an interdisciplinary approach, with opportunities for students to engage with both artistic practice and theoretical study.

=== Degree Programs ===
KhK offers the following degree-granting programs:

- Fine Arts: A program leading to an artistic degree, covering a range of studio-based practices.
- Product Design: A diploma program with subject areas including industrial design, furniture design, exhibition architecture, and textile product design.
- Visual Communication: An artistic degree program offering areas of focus such as animation, film and moving image, photography, games, illustration and comics, new media, graphic design, sound, and visual theory.
- Art Education: Programs qualifying students to teach art in primary and secondary schools, including tracks in special education.
- Art History and Aesthetics: Programs at the bachelor's, master's, and doctoral levels, covering historical and theoretical analysis of art.

=== Postgraduate Studies ===
Postgraduate opportunities at KhK include master's degrees, artistic qualification phases, doctoral studies, and habilitation. These options are designed for further specialization in academic or artistic fields.

=== Workshops and Facilities ===
The university maintains 14 technical and artistic workshops that support instruction and independent project work. These include facilities for photography, book and paper, ceramics, metal, textiles, screen printing, typography, digital production, and other media.

=== International Study ===
Kunsthochschule Kassel participates in international academic exchange and mobility programs. The institution maintains partnerships with art and design schools in other countries and supports students in arranging study abroad, internships, and academic exchanges.

== Notable people ==
=== Notable alumni ===
- Daniel Stieglitz (born 1980), caricature artist, director and writer.
- Peter Angermann (born 1945), painter
- Sinan Akkuş (born 1971), director, writer and actor
- Julius Bien (1826−1909)
- August Bromeis
- Paul Ehrhardt (1888−1981), student 1929−1931
- Bernd Friedmann
- Horst Gläsker
- Ludwig Emil Grimm
- Dörte Helm (1898−1941), student 1915−1918
- Annie Höfken-Hempel (1899–1965), sculptor
- Siglinde Kallnbach, attended 1976−1983
- Harry Kramer
- Eduard Niczky
- Bjørn Melhus
- Eva Moll
- Amalie Tischbein
- Halsey Rodman
- Wilhelm Schmidthild
- Miao Xiaochun

=== Notable faculty ===
- Bernhard, Count of Bylandt (1905–1998), artist, sculptor, writer and professor
- Hans Sautter (1877–1961), became professor in 1919, director from 1931 to 1933
- Curt Witte (1882–1959), professor from 1916 to 1932, director from 1925 to 1931

== See also ==
- Collegium Carolinum (Kassel)
