= Amalie Tischbein =

German artist and painter (1757 - 1839)

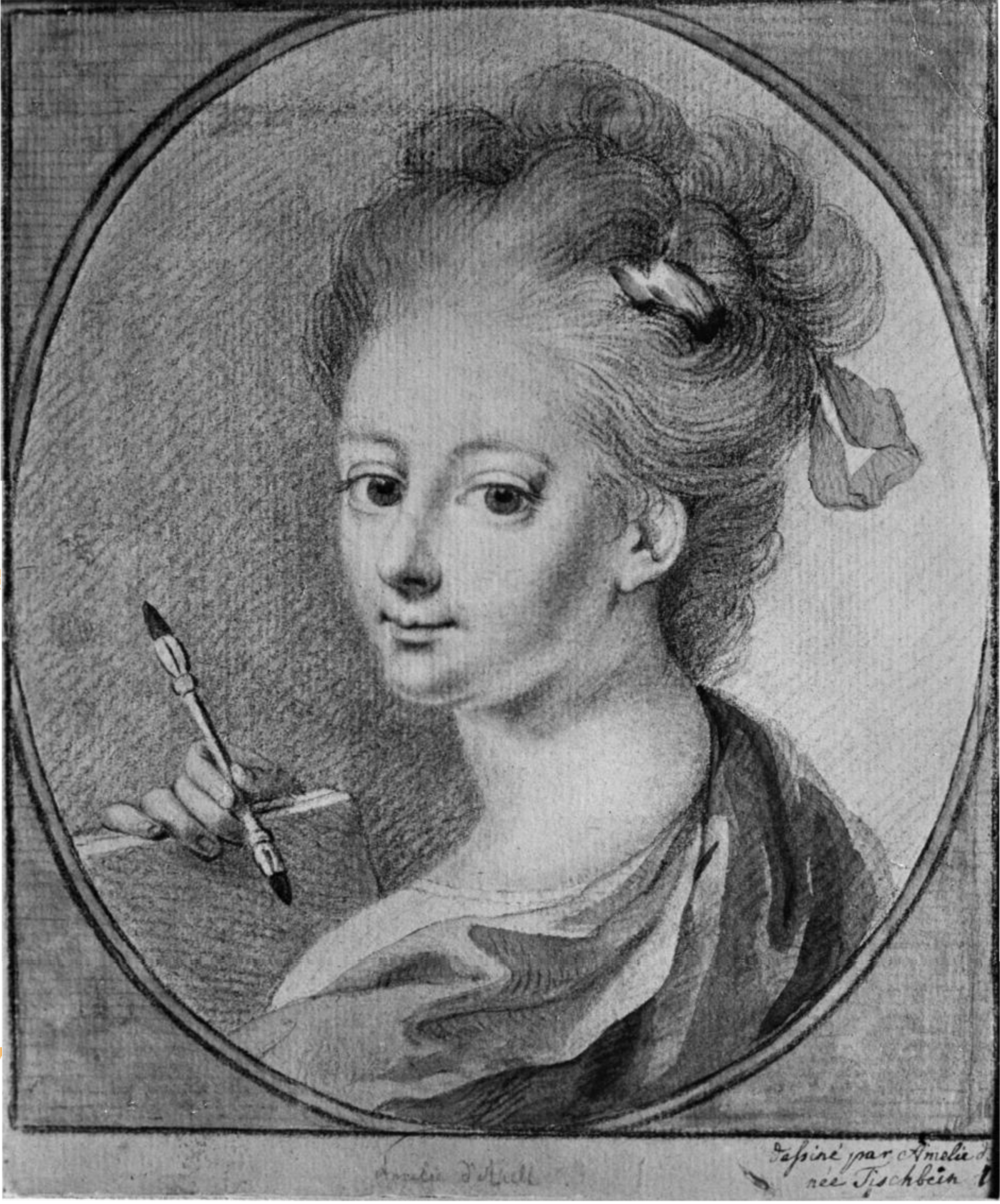
- Self-portrait
- Born: 1755; Kassel, Hesse, Germany
- Died: 1839 (aged 83–84)

Wilhelmine Caroline Amalie Tischbein (born Apell, 1757–1839) was a German drawing artist, miniature painter and etcher from the Kassel branch of the Tischbein family of artists. She worked in Weimar, then Kassel.

== Life ==
Amalie Tischbein was born in Kassel at the beginning of the Seven Years' War in 1757 as the daughter of Marie Sophie Tischbein (née Robert) and the painter Johann Heinrich Tischbein. Her mother came from a distinguished Huguenot family that had been resident in Kassel since the end of the 17th century. She had married Tischbein in 1756 and died a few months after giving birth to a second daughter in 1759. Amalie's father married his sister-in-law Anne Marie Pernette in 1763, who also died the following year. These deaths likely had a strong impact on the "intimate relationship" between father and daughters, as noted by a contemporary biographer.

Amalie Tischbein was considered an "outstanding beauty" or graceful, intelligent, and eloquent, and was frequently portrayed by her father.

In Weimar, which she visited in 1775, Amalie Tischbein met the poet Christoph Martin Wieland, who dedicated an ode (Der Grazien jüngste zu schildern ...) to her in gratitude for a self-portrait she had produced an expression of friendship not uncommon at the time. In 1778, she attended the second class of the Kassel Academy of Fine Arts. She married in May of that year.

In May of the same year, Amalie Tischbein married David Apell (from 1803: von Apell), who was an assessor at the Kriegs- und Domänenkammer in Kassel and later became Geheimer Kammerrat and intendant of the court theater under Landgrave Wilhelm IX. Their first son Wilhelm was born in 1779, followed by Carl (1781) and daughter Louise in 1782. The couple later divorced. to which the husband's extravagance and character are rumored to have contributed.[3]

Amalie Tischbein was recognized as an artist - especially of miniatures - during her lifetime and probably exhibited several works on the occasion of the exhibitions of the Kassel Academy of Arts.In 1780, she was appointed an honorary member of the academy. She lived "as a divorced woman [...] sufficiently provided for" in high esteem in Kassel society until her death.

== Works ==
Miniature portraits by Amalie Tischbein, for example, were exhibited at the Darmstadt Century Exhibition in 1914. The estates of the Fiorino and Bose families in Kassel are also said to have included works by her, but their whereabouts (as of 2016) remain unclear for the time being. An exhibition at the Haina Monastery in 2016 entitled uncovered - female painters in Tischbein's environment and the Kassel Art Academy 1777-1830 showed a portrait of Philippine Amalie, Landgravine of Hesse-Kassel, which had been attributed to her father until then, as well as a drawn self-portrait by Amalie Tischbein.
