= Harry Kramer (German artist) =

German sculptor, choreographer, dancer, and professor

Harry Kramer (25 January 1925, Lingen – 20 February 1997, Kassel) was a German sculptor, choreographer, dancer, and professor of art at the Kunsthochschule Kassel. He is best known for his kinetic sculptures from the early 1960s.

== Origin and education ==
Harry Karl Kramer was born in 1925 as the son of Johann Kramer, plumber in the Lingen repair shop, and the seamstress Elisabeth, née Keppler from Nijmegen, at Hinterstrasse 2 in Lingen. The mother named the son Harry after actor Harry Piel; she died young of tuberculosis in 1932. The father married a second time and had himself transferred to the Neumünster repair shop, where the son began an apprenticeship as a hairdresser after attending elementary school in 1939. When the Second World War broke out, the 14-year-old was on his way to America with an illegally procured free ticket from the Deutsche Reichsbahn, but only got as far as the Osnabrück police prison, where his father ransomed him. Harry Kramer then worked as a hairdresser in Lingen until 1942. During these years he also tried unsuccessfully as an acting student in Osnabrück and in Münster.
