= New Gallery (Kassel) =

Art museum in Kassel, Germany

Coordinates: 51°18′37″N 9°29′42″E

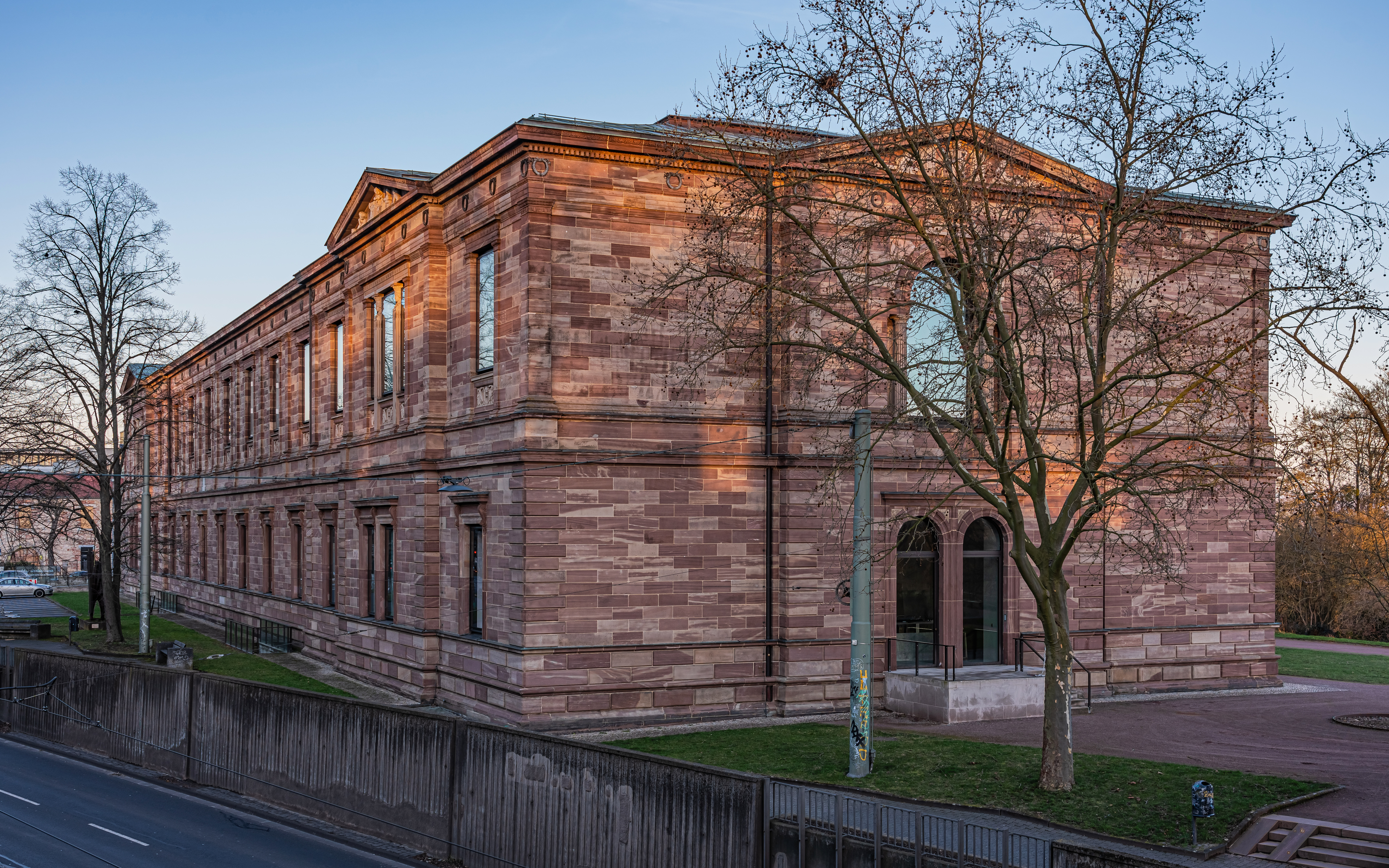
Neue Galerie

The Neue Galerie (New Gallery) is an art museum in Kassel in the state of Hesse, in Germany. The building was constructed between 1871 and 1877 as a museum for works of the Old Masters. The building was damaged and burned out on 22 October 1943 in a devastating air raid carried out on the orders of Winston Churchill. The 60 most important works were brought to Vienna, and were returned in 1956. The building and large parts of the collection were lost. The museum was reopened with its present name in 1976, and a large renovation was completed in 2011.

== History ==
=== The old museum ===
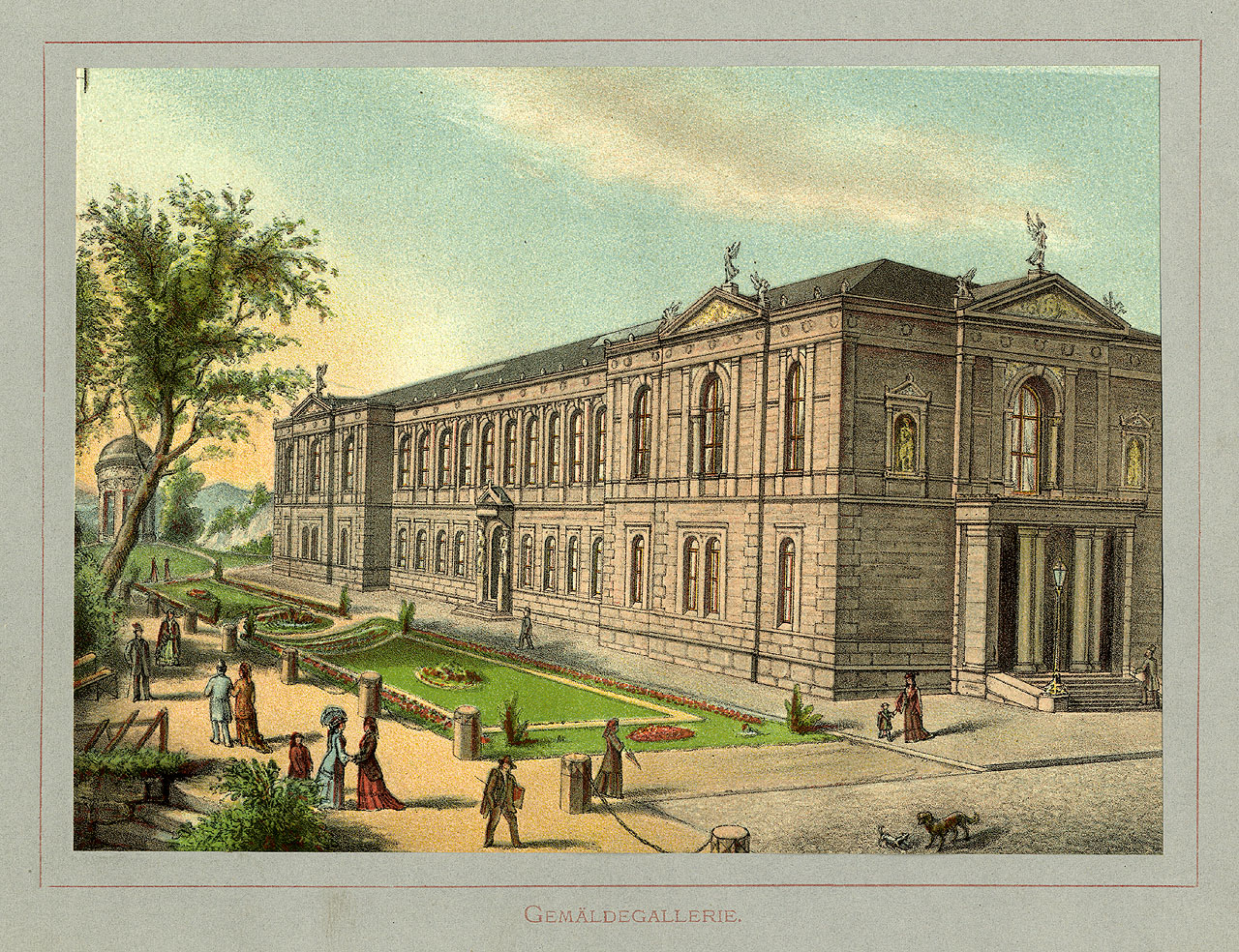
The building in 1880

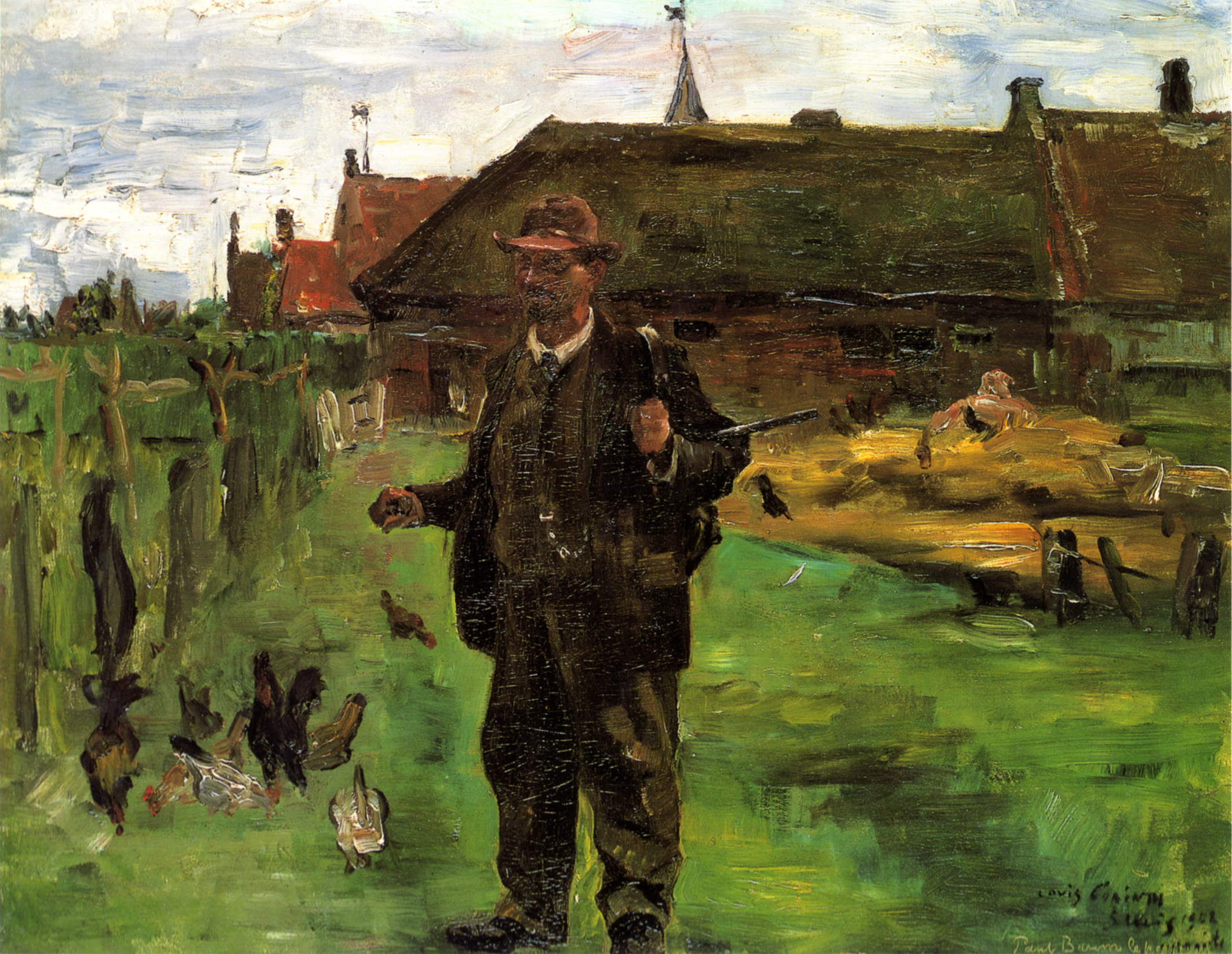
Paul Baum in Sluis by Lovis Corinth, (City art collection, Kassel)

A previous building was built in the years 1749 to 1752 by François de Cuvilliés for the Landgrave William VIII. During the French occupation under Jérôme Bonaparte this building was transformed into a city residence. In August 1869 a new building for the gallery was designed by Heinrich von Dehn-Rotfelser, architect and professor of architecture at the Academy in Kassel and opened on 28 December 1877. Dehn-Rotfelser's gallery building had a length of 89.3 m. The width of the pavilions was 24 m, the central block of 22 m. The roof began at a height of 15 meters. The central hall was 17.72 m with the longest, the next two were 11 m long. The fourth main exhibition space, located in the west pavilion was 15.53 m long. The highlight of the exhibition was the collection of Dutch old masters, works by painters such as Rembrandt, Paul Potter and Philips Wouwerman.

== The new museum ==
The new museum was opened on 4 September 1976 and included an additional collection of contemporary art works from the 19th and 20th centuries with Romantic and Impressionist paintings by artists such as Carl Schuch, Lovis Corinth and Max Slevogt. A large collection of German Expressionists is shown, and a room contains sculptures by Joseph Beuys. In 2011 the museum was renovated and restored with more historic details. It is part of the Museumslandschaft Hessen Kassel.
