= Table of years in architecture =

The table of years in architecture is a tabular display of all years in architecture, for overview and quick navigation to any year.

Contents: 2000s - 1900s - 1800s - 1700s - 1600s - 1500s - 1400s - 1300s - 1200s - 1100s - 1000s - Other

== 2000s in architecture ==
2000 2001 2002 2003 2004 2005 2006 2007 2008 2009 2010 2011 2012 2013 2014 2015 2016 2017 2018 2019
2020 2021 2022 2023

== 1900s in architecture ==
1900 1901 1902 1903 1904 1905 1906 1907 1908 1909 1910 1911 1912 1913 1914 1915 1916 1917 1918 1919
1920 1921 1922 1923 1924 1925 1926 1927 1928 1929 1930 1931 1932 1933 1934 1935 1936 1937 1938 1939
1940 1941 1942 1943 1944 1945 1946 1947 1948 1949 1950 1951 1952 1953 1954 1955 1956 1957 1958 1959
1960 1961 1962 1963 1964 1965 1966 1967 1968 1969 1970 1971 1972 1973 1974 1975 1976 1977 1978 1979
1980 1981 1982 1983 1984 1985 1986 1987 1988 1989 1990 1991 1992 1993 1994 1995 1996 1997 1998 1999

== 1800s in architecture ==
1800 1801 1802 1803 1804 1805 1806 1807 1808 1809 1810 1811 1812 1813 1814 1815 1816 1817 1818 1819
1820 1821 1822 1823 1824 1825 1826 1827 1828 1829 1830 1831 1832 1833 1834 1835 1836 1837 1838 1839
1840 1841 1842 1843 1844 1845 1846 1847 1848 1849 1850 1851 1852 1853 1854 1855 1856 1857 1858 1859
1860 1861 1862 1863 1864 1865 1866 1867 1868 1869 1870 1871 1872 1873 1874 1875 1876 1877 1878 1879
1880 1881 1882 1883 1884 1885 1886 1887 1888 1889 1890 1891 1892 1893 1894 1895 1896 1897 1898 1899

== 1700s in architecture ==
1700 1701 1702 1703 1704 1705 1706 1707 1708 1709 1710 1711 1712 1713 1714 1715 1716 1717 1718 1719
1720 1721 1722 1723 1724 1725 1726 1727 1728 1729 1730 1731 1732 1733 1734 1735 1736 1737 1738 1739
1740 1741 1742 1743 1744 1745 1746 1747 1748 1749 1750 1751 1752 1753 1754 1755 1756 1757 1758 1759
1760 1761 1762 1763 1764 1765 1766 1767 1768 1769 1770 1771 1772 1773 1774 1775 1776 1777 1778 1779
1780 1781 1782 1783 1784 1785 1786 1787 1788 1789 1790 1791 1792 1793 1794 1795 1796 1797 1798 1799

== 1600s in architecture ==
1600 1601 1602 1603 1604 1605 1606 1607 1608 1609 1610 1611 1612 1613 1614 1615 1616 1617 1618 1619
1620 1621 1622 1623 1624 1625 1626 1627 1628 1629 1630 1631 1632 1633 1634 1635 1636 1637 1638 1639
1640 1641 1642 1643 1644 1645 1646 1647 1648 1649 1650 1651 1652 1653 1654 1655 1656 1657 1658 1659
1660 1661 1662 1663 1664 1665 1666 1667 1668 1669 1670 1671 1672 1673 1674 1675 1676 1677 1678 1679
1680 1681 1682 1683 1684 1685 1686 1687 1688 1689 1690 1691 1692 1693 1694 1695 1696 1697 1698 1699

Redirected by decade:

1600s - 1610s - 1620s - 1630s - 1640s - 1650s - 1660s - 1670s - 1680s - 1690s

== 1500s in architecture ==
1500 1501 1502 1503 1504 1505 1506 1507 1508 1509 1510 1511 1512 1513 1514 1515 1516 1517 1518 1519
1520 1521 1522 1523 1524 1525 1526 1527 1528 1529 1530 1531 1532 1533 1534 1535 1536 1537 1538 1539
1540 1541 1542 1543 1544 1545 1546 1547 1548 1549 1550 1551 1552 1553 1554 1555 1556 1557 1558 1559
1560 1561 1562 1563 1564 1565 1566 1567 1568 1569 1570 1571 1572 1573 1574 1575 1576 1577 1578 1579
1580 1581 1582 1583 1584 1585 1586 1587 1588 1589 1590 1591 1592 1593 1594 1595 1596 1597 1598 1599

Redirected by decade: 1500s - 1510s - 1520s - 1530s - 1540s - 1550s - 1560s - 1570s - 1580s - 1590s

== 1400s in architecture ==
1400 1401 1402 1403 1404 1405 1406 1407 1408 1409 1410 1411 1412 1413 1414 1415 1416 1417 1418 1419
1420 1421 1422 1423 1424 1425 1426 1427 1428 1429 1430 1431 1432 1433 1434 1435 1436 1437 1438 1439
1440 1441 1442 1443 1444 1445 1446 1447 1448 1449 1450 1451 1452 1453 1454 1455 1456 1457 1458 1459
1460 1461 1462 1463 1464 1465 1466 1467 1468 1469 1470 1471 1472 1473 1474 1475 1476 1477 1478 1479
1480 1481 1482 1483 1484 1485 1486 1487 1488 1489 1490 1491 1492 1493 1494 1495 1496 1497 1498 1499

Redirected by decade: 1400s - 1410s - 1420s - 1430s - 1440s - 1450s - 1460s - 1470s - 1480s - 1490s

== 1300s in architecture ==
1300 1301 1302 1303 1304 1305 1306 1307 1308 1309 1310 1311 1312 1313 1314 1315 1316 1317 1318 1319
1320 1321 1322 1323 1324 1325 1326 1327 1328 1329 1330 1331 1332 1333 1334 1335 1336 1337 1338 1339
1340 1341 1342 1343 1344 1345 1346 1347 1348 1349 1350 1351 1352 1353 1354 1355 1356 1357 1358 1359
1360 1361 1362 1363 1364 1365 1366 1367 1368 1369 1370 1371 1372 1373 1374 1375 1376 1377 1378 1379
1380 1381 1382 1383 1384 1385 1386 1387 1388 1389 1390 1391 1392 1393 1394 1395 1396 1397 1398 1399

Redirected by decade: 1300s - 1310s - 1320s - 1330s - 1340s - 1350s - 1360s - 1370s - 1380s - 1390s.
Redirected to century from each decade: 14th century in architecture.

== 1200s in architecture ==
1200 1201 1202 1203 1204 1205 1206 1207 1208 1209 1210 1211 1212 1213 1214 1215 1216 1217 1218 1219
1220 1221 1222 1223 1224 1225 1226 1227 1228 1229 1230 1231 1232 1233 1234 1235 1236 1237 1238 1239
1240 1241 1242 1243 1244 1245 1246 1247 1248 1249 1250 1251 1252 1253 1254 1255 1256 1257 1258 1259
1260 1261 1262 1263 1264 1265 1266 1267 1268 1269 1270 1271 1272 1273 1274 1275 1276 1277 1278 1279
1280 1281 1282 1283 1284 1285 1286 1287 1288 1289 1290 1291 1292 1293 1294 1295 1296 1297 1298 1299

Redirected by decade: 1200s - 1210s - 1220s - 1230s - 1240s - 1250s - 1260s - 1270s - 1280s - 1290s

== 1100s in architecture ==
1100s - 1110s - 1120s - 1130s - 1140s - 1150s - 1160s - 1170s - 1180s - 1190s

== 1000s in architecture ==
1000s - 1010s - 1020s - 1030s - 1040s - 1050s - 1060s - 1070s - 1080s - 1090s

== Other years in architecture ==
2nd Millennium AD

20th century in architecture - 19th century in architecture - 18th century in architecture - 17th century in architecture - 16th century in architecture
15th century in architecture - 14th century in architecture - 13th century in architecture - 12th century in architecture - 11th century in architecture

1st Millennium AD

10th century in architecture - 9th century in architecture - 8th century in architecture - 7th century in architecture - 6th century in architecture
5th century in architecture - 4th century in architecture - 3rd century in architecture - 2nd century in architecture - 1st century in architecture

1st Millennium BC

1st century BC in architecture - 2nd century BC in architecture - 3rd century BC in architecture - 4th century BC in architecture - 5th century BC in architecture
6th century BC in architecture - 7th century BC in architecture - 8th century BC in architecture - 9th century BC in architecture - 10th century BC in architecture

2nd Millennium BC

11th century BC in architecture - 12th century BC in architecture - 13th century BC in architecture - 14th century BC in architecture - 15th century BC in architecture
16th century BC in architecture - 17th century BC in architecture - 18th century BC in architecture - 19th century BC in architecture - 20th century BC in architecture

3rd Millennium BC

21st century BC in architecture - 22nd century BC in architecture - 23rd century BC in architecture - 24th century BC in architecture - 25th century BC in architecture
26th century BC in architecture - 27th century BC in architecture - 28th century BC in architecture - 29th century BC in architecture - 30th century BC in architecture

Neolithic

4th millennium BC in architecture

== See also ==
- Timeline of architecture
