= 1490s in architecture =

List of years in architecture	(table)
- … 1480; 1481; 1482; 1483; 1484; 1485; 1486; 1487; 1488; 1489; 1490; 1491; 1492; 1493; 1494; 1495; 1496; 1497; 1498; 1499; 1500 …
- Buildings and structures: Art; Archaeology; Architecture; Literature; Music; Philosophy; Science; +...

- 1480s
- 1490s in architecture
- 1500s
Other topics in 1490s:
- Art
- Music

== Buildings and structures ==
=== Buildings ===
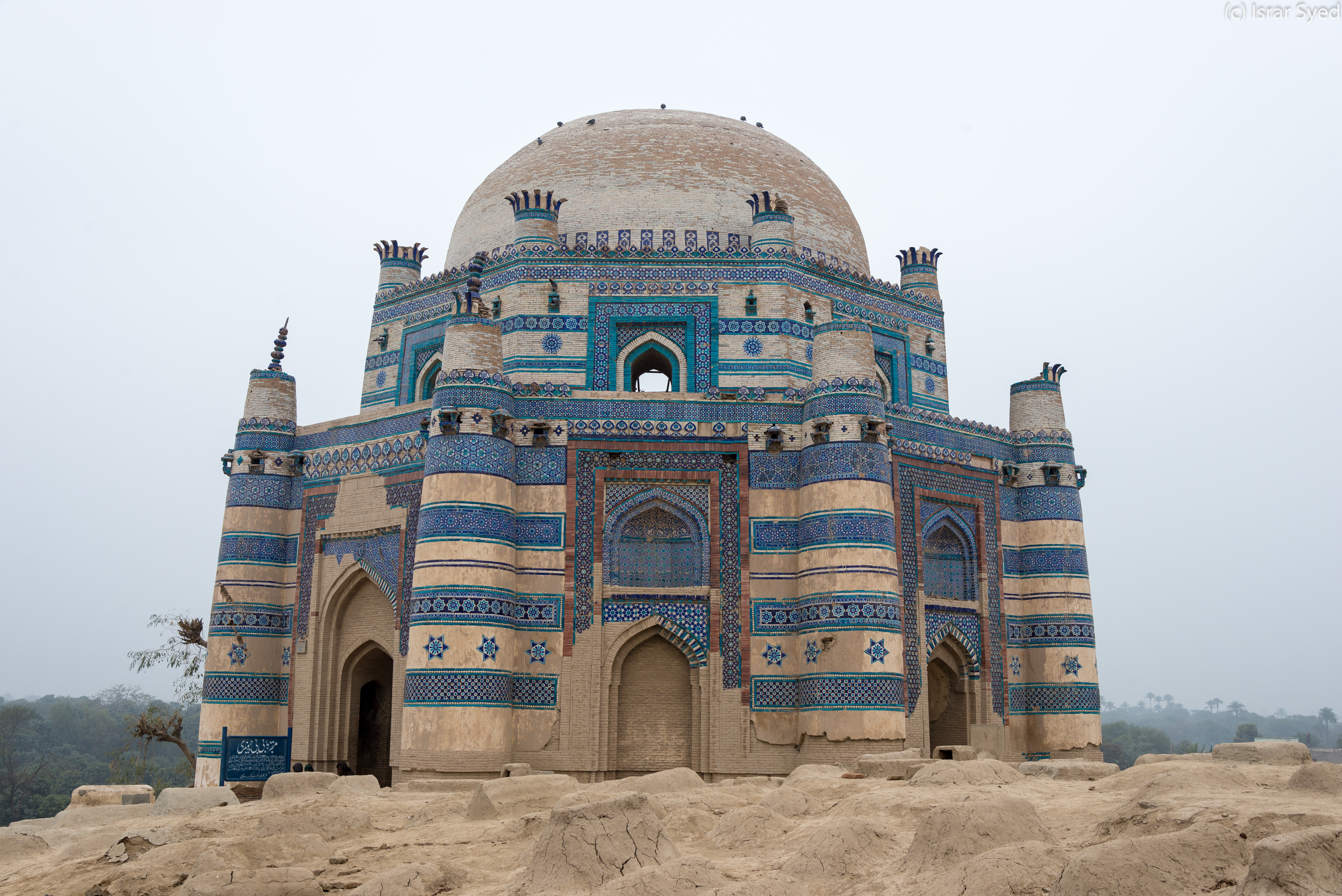
Tomb of Bibi Jawindi

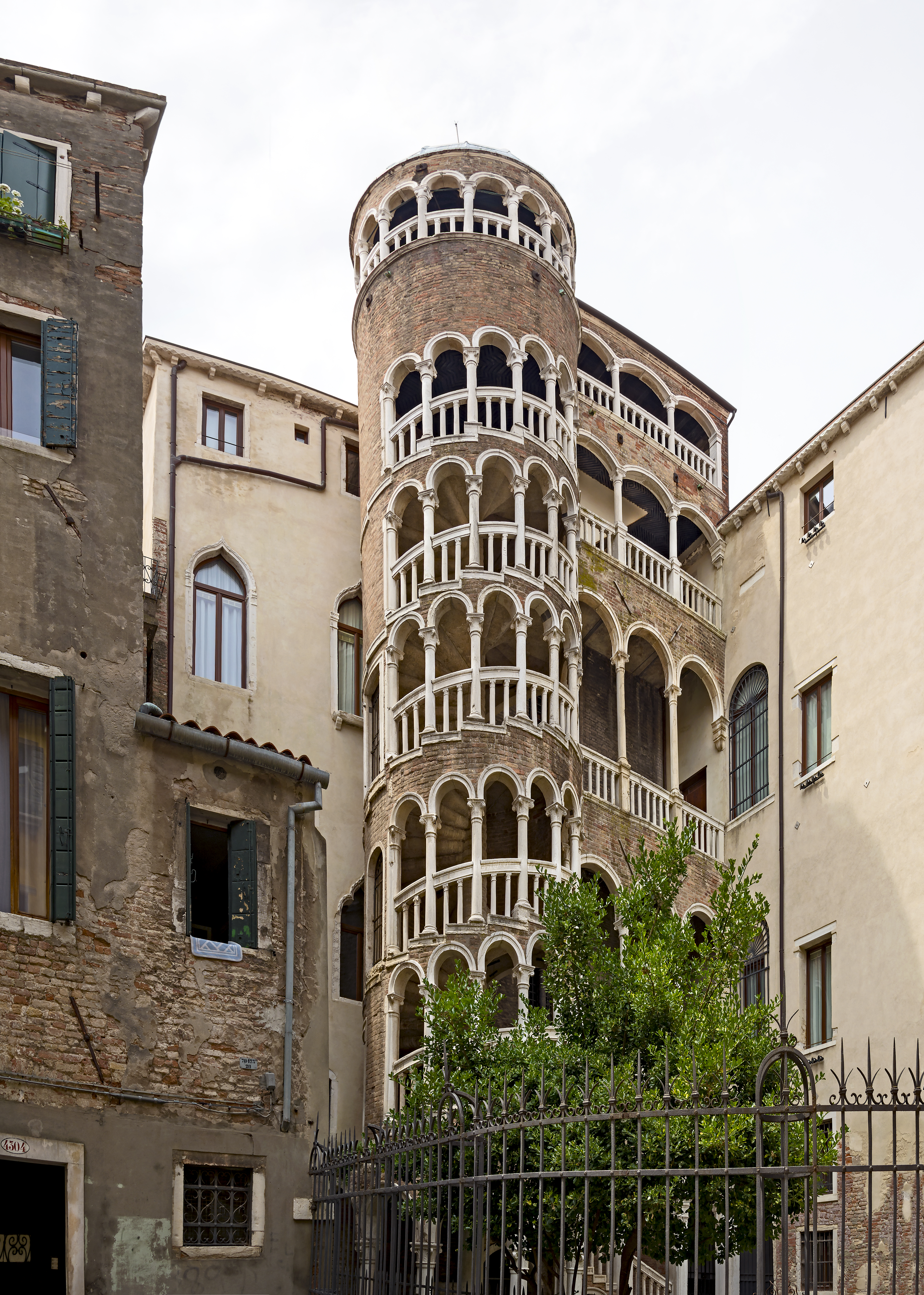
Spiral staircase, Palazzo Contarini del Bovolo, Venice

- St Edmund's Church, Southwold in England is completed.
- Church of St. Valentin, Kiedrich in Hesse (Germany) is completed.
- 1490
  - Bara Gumbad in Delhi is built.
  - Probable completion of rebuilding of Sherborne Abbey choir, England, with a Perpendicular style fan vault by William Smyth.
  - All Saints' Church, Wittenberg (Schloßkirche), designed by Conrad Pflüger, begun.
  - Former Nea Ekklesia church in Constantinople destroyed by a lightning strike.
- 1493 – Tomb of Bibi Jawindi at Uch in the Punjab region is built.
- 1495 – Monastery of Jesus of Setúbal in Portugal, designed by Diogo de Boitaca, is completed.
- 1497 – Rebuilding of Holy Trinity Church, Long Melford in England is completed.
- 1497 – Santa Maria delle Grazie in Milan, Italy is completed.
- 1498 – Church of St Martin, Landshut, Bavaria (Germany) is completed by Hans von Burghausen.
- 1499
  - Garden loggia and external spiral staircase at Palazzo Contarini del Bovolo in Venice, probably designed by Giorgio Spavento, completed.
  - Start of construction of Abbaye de la Trinité, Vendôme.

== Births ==
- c. 1495 – Diego Siloe, Spanish Renaissance architect and sculptor (died 1563)

== Deaths ==
- 1490 – William Smyth, English architect
- c. 1493 – Enna Swarviski (born c. 1427)
- 1494 (last record) – Luca Fancelli, Italian architect and sculptor (born c. 1430)
