= 1530s in architecture =

- 1520s
- 1530s in architecture
- 1540s

Architecture timeline

== Buildings and structures ==
=== Buildings ===
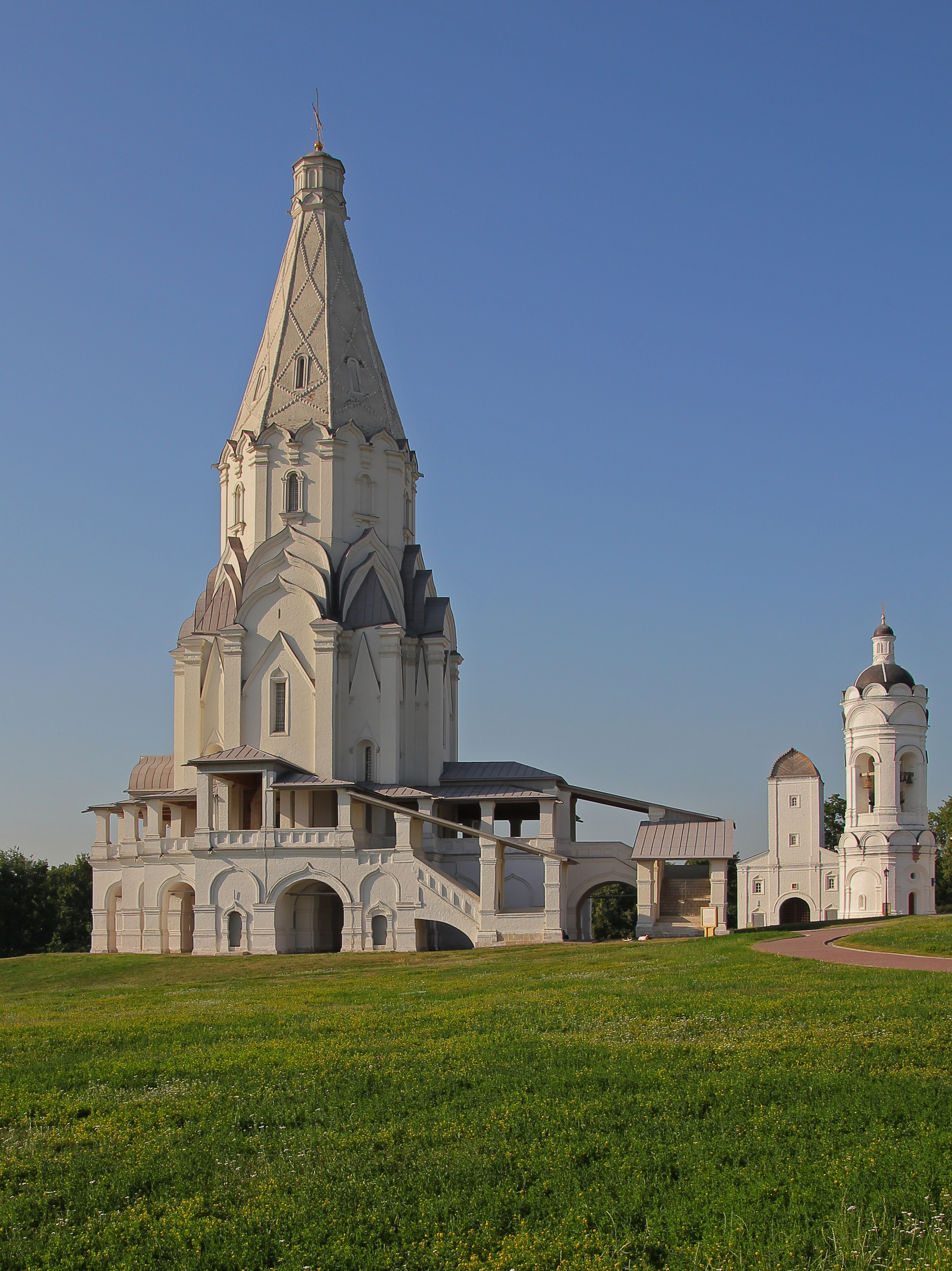
Church of the Ascension, Kolomenskoye

- 1531 – Kõpu Lighthouse on Hiiumaa begins operation.
- 1532–1536
  - Rood screen in King's College Chapel, Cambridge in England is erected.
  - Palazzo Massimo alle Colonne in Rome, designed by Baldassare Peruzzi, is built.
- c. 1532–1537 – Palazzo Massimo di Pirro in Rome, designed by Giovanni Mangone, is built.
- 1532
  - Church of the Ascension (the "White Column") at Kolomenskoye, near Moscow, is built.
  - Church of the Royal Monastery of Brou in France (begun 1506) is completed.
- 1533 – Work begins on La Fortaleza in Puerto Rico.
- 1534 – Regensburg Cathedral in Germany is completed after 259 years of work.
- c. 1535–1537 – Casa Aliaga in Lima (Ciudad de los Reyes), Peru, is built.
- 1535 – After 258 years of work since 1277, St Alphege Church in Solihull, England, is completed.
- 1537 – Work begins on the Biblioteca Marciana in Venice, designed by Jacopo Sansovino.
- 1538 – Work begins on
  - Nonsuch Palace in Surrey, England.
  - The Piazza del Campidoglio on the Capitoline Hill in Rome, designed by Michelangelo. Pope Paul III moves the Equestrian Statue of Marcus Aurelius to the Capitoline Hill.
  - Adding bastions to the city walls of Nuremberg, to the design of Maltese military engineer Antonio Falzon.
- 1539 – Work begins on the first batch of Device Forts on the coast of England, including Cowes Castle on the Isle of Wight.

== Events ==
- 1537 – Sebastiano Serlio publishes the first volume of his architectural treatise, Tutte l'opere d'archittura et prospetiva, in Venice, putting the classical orders into canonical form.

== Births ==
- 1530 – Juan de Herrera, Spanish architect (died 1593)
- c. 1531 – Bernardo Buontalenti, Florentine architect, stage designer, military engineer and artist (died 1608)
- 1533 – Giovanni Antonio Dosio, Italian architect and sculptor (died 1609)
- 1535
  - Early? - Robert Smythson, English architect (died 1614)
  - June 18 – Jakub Krčín, Czech architect (died 1604)
- c. 1536 – Ottaviano Nonni, Bolognese architect, sculptor and painter working in Rome (died 1606)
- 1538 – Pablo de Céspedes, Spanish painter, poet and architect (died 1608)

== Deaths ==
- 1530: Approximate date – Bramantino, Milanese painter and architect (born c.1456)
- 1532 – Andrea Riccio, Italian sculptor and architect (born c.1470)
- 1534: December 27 – Antonio da Sangallo the Elder, Florentine architect (born 1453)
- 1536: January 6 – Baldassare Peruzzi, Sienese architect and painter working in Rome (born 1481)
- 1539 – Marco Palmezzano, Italian painter and architect from Forli (born 1460)
