= 1510s in architecture =

List of years in architecture	(table)
- … 1500; 1501; 1502; 1503; 1504; 1505; 1506; 1507; 1508; 1509; 1510; 1511; 1512; 1513; 1514; 1515; 1516; 1517; 1518; 1519; 1520 …
- Buildings and structures: Art; Archaeology; Architecture; Literature; Music; Philosophy; Science; +...

- 1500s
- 1510s in architecture
- 1520s
Other topics in 1510s:
- Music

== Events ==
- 1511 – Dome of Seville Cathedral collapses.
- 1512: March 5: West tower of Pieterskerk, Leiden, collapses.

== Buildings and structures ==
=== Buildings ===
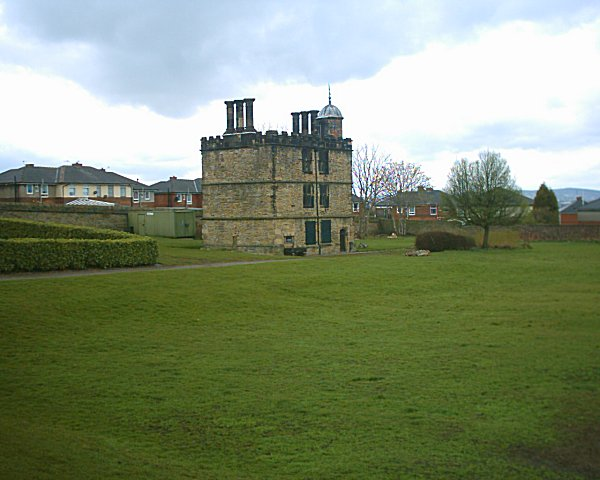
Turret House at Sheffield Manor

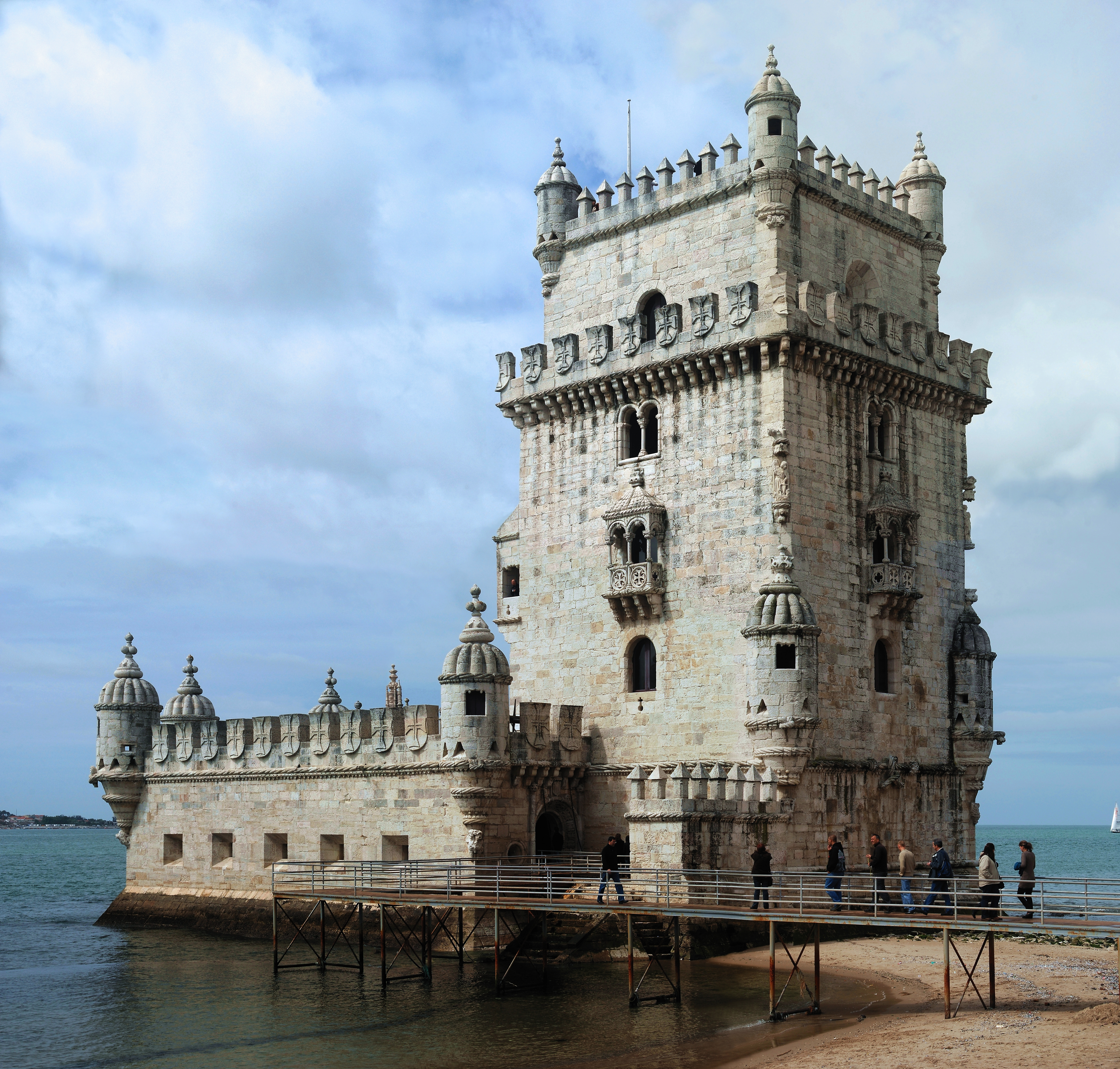
Belém Tower

- 1510–1520 – Tower ("Stump") of St Botolph's Church, Boston, England, completed.
- 1510
  - Alcázar de Colón ("Columbus' Palace") in Santo Domingo, the 22-room home of Don Diego Columbus.
  - Sheffield Manor in Yorkshire, England.
- 1511 – All Saints' Church, Wittenberg (Schloßkirche) completed to a design by Conrad Pflüger.
- 1513 – Work on New Cathedral, Salamanca, begun.
- 1514 – St Mark's Campanile in Venice completed in final form.
- 1515 – Cardinal Wolsey begins rebuilding Hampton Court Palace on the River Thames near London.
- 1515–1518 – Ancienne Douane (Haguenau) built.
- About 1515 – In England
  - King's College Chapel, Cambridge completed by John Wastell.
  - Spire of St James' Church, Louth, Lincolnshire completed.
- 1517 – Shisha Gumbad tomb in Delhi, India, completed.
- 1518
  - Tomb of Sikandar Lodi, Delhi, India, completed.
  - Town walls of Loreto, Marche, begun by Antonio da Sangallo the Younger.
- 1519
  - Belém Tower at the mouth of the Tagus in Portugal completed.
  - St. Olaf's Church, Tallinn in Estonia completed.

== Births ==
- 1511: July 3 – Giorgio Vasari, Italian painter and biographer (died 1574)
- 1511 – Bartolomeo Ammannati, Italian sculptor and architect (died 1592)
- 1512 – Galeazzo Alessi, Italian architect (died 1572)
- c.1513 – Pirro Ligorio, Italian architect and painter (died 1583)

== Deaths ==
- 1511 – Simón de Colonia, Spanish architect and sculptor
- 1514: March 11 – Donato Bramante, Italian architect (born 1444)
- 1515
  - April 10 – Mateus Fernandes, Portuguese architect
  - Giovanni Giocondo, Italian friar, architect and classical scholar (born c. 1433)
- c. 1516 – Giuliano da Sangallo, Florentine sculptor, architect and military engineer (born 1443)
- 1518 – John Wastell, English architect (born 1460)
- 1519: May 2 – Leonardo da Vinci, Italian polymath (born 1452)
