= 1500s in architecture =

| List of years in architecture | (table) |
- … 1490; 1491; 1492; 1493; 1494; 1495; 1496; 1497; 1498; 1499; 1500; 1501; 1502; 1503; 1504; 1505; 1506; 1507; 1508; 1509; 1510 …
- Buildings and structures: Art; Archaeology; Architecture; Literature; Music; Philosophy; Science; +...

- 1490s
- 1500s in architecture
- 1510s
Other topics in 1500s:
- Music

== Buildings and structures ==
=== Buildings ===
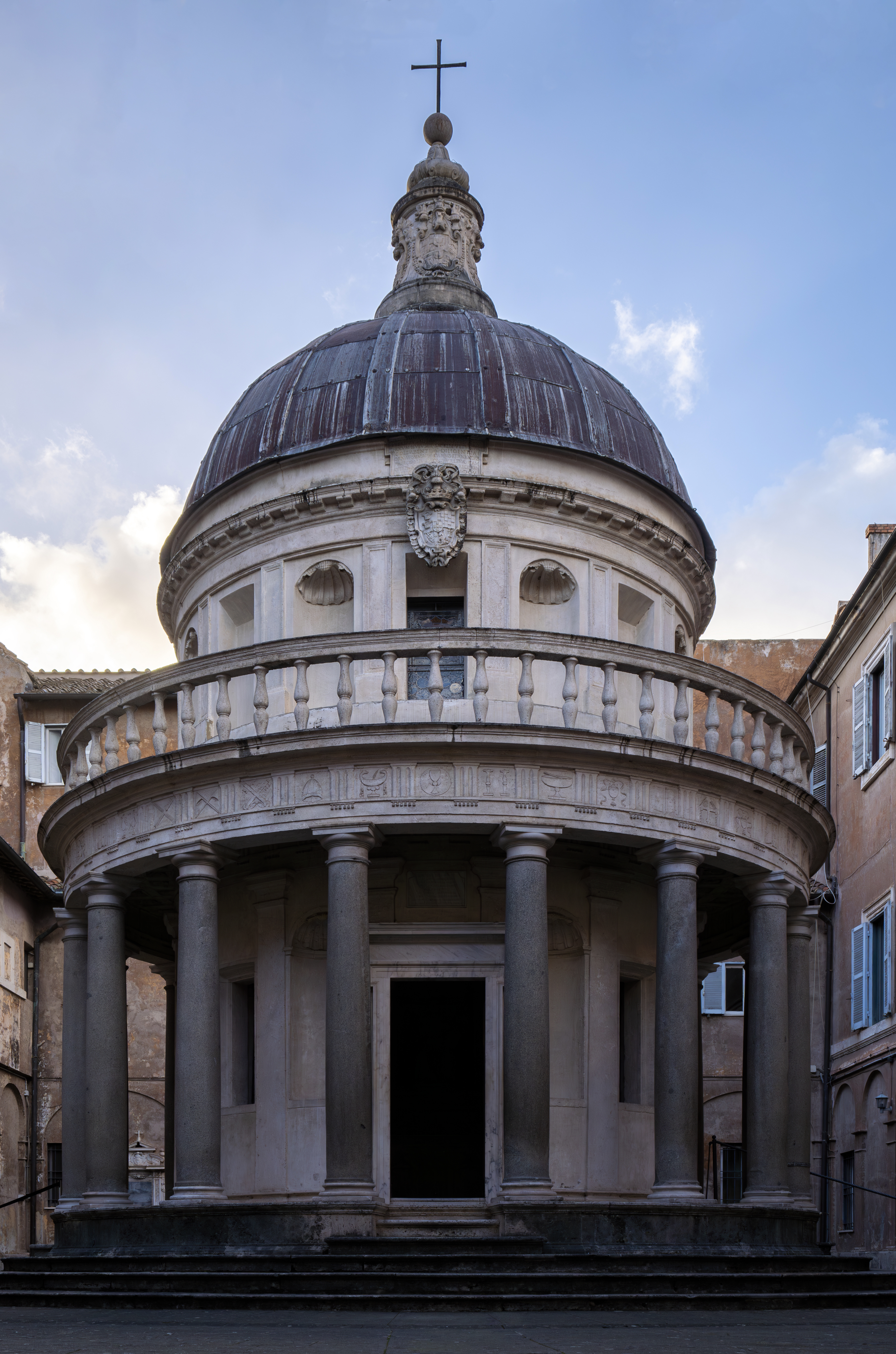
Tempietto, San Pietro in Montorio (Rome) by Bramante

- c. 1500 – Chateau de Blois largely rebuilt.
- 1500 – St. Anne's Church, Vilnius is completed.
- 1501
  - Expansion of Holyrood Palace, Edinburgh.
  - Chichester Cross is built in Chichester, England.
  - Construction of the Jerónimos Monastery at Belém (Lisbon) in Portugal begins; it will take 100 years to complete.
  - Construction of spire of St James' Church, Louth, Lincolnshire, England begins; it will take until c.1515 to complete.
- 1501/2 – Construction of the Ducal Palace of Vila Viçosa in the Duchy of Braganza (Portugal) begins.
- 1502
  - Tempietto, San Pietro in Montorio, Rome, designed by Donato Bramante, is built.
  - Construction of St. Mary's Church, Gdańsk, begun in 1379 by Heinrich Ungeradin, is completed with the installation of vaulting by Heinrich Haetzl.
  - Vladislav Hall in Prague Castle, designed by Benedikt Rejt, is completed.
  - Expansion of Great Malvern Priory in England is completed.
- 1503 – All Saints' Church, Wittenberg (Schlosskirche) is consecrated.
- 1504 – Matsumoto Castle in Japan built.

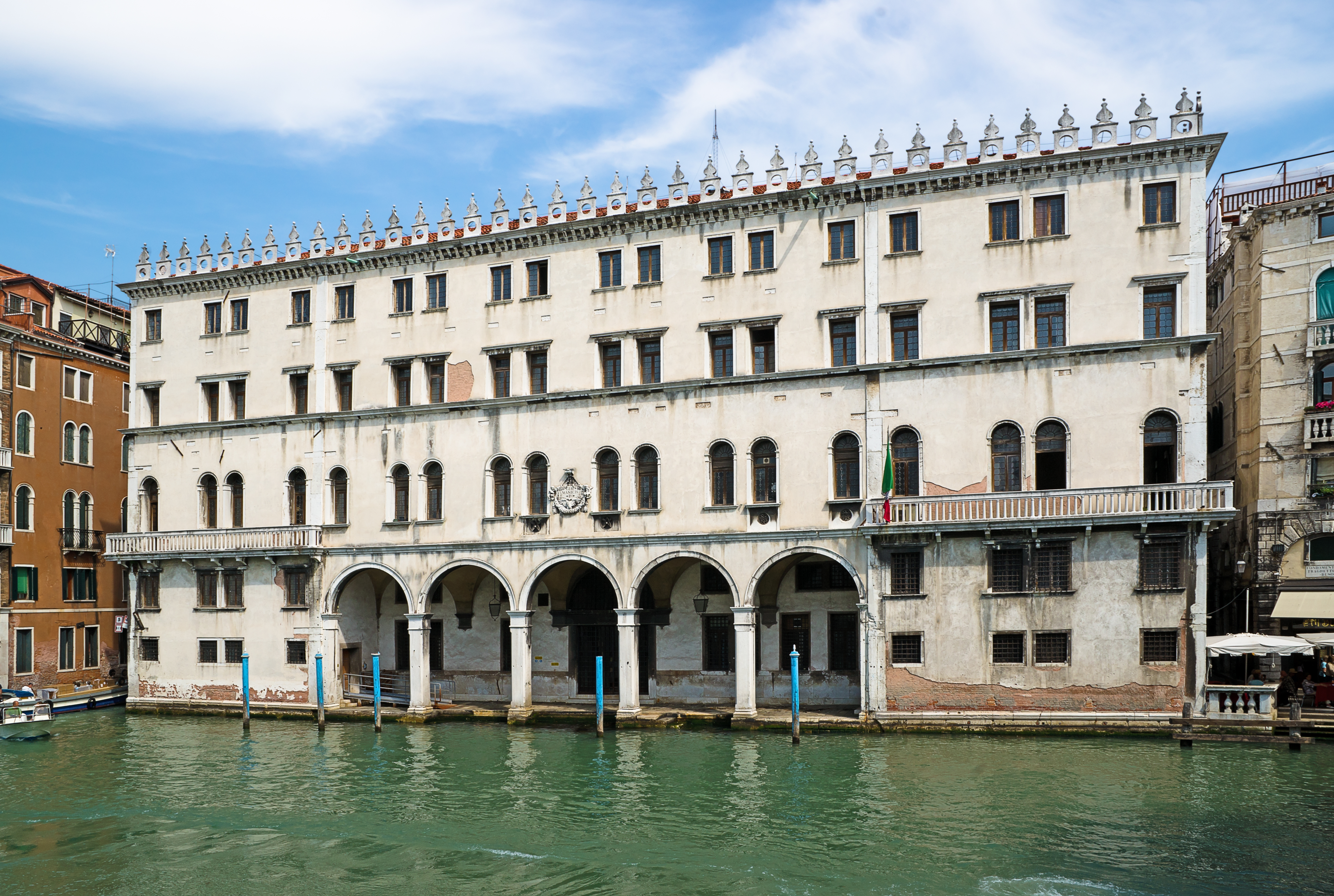
Fondaco dei Tedeschi on Grand Canal (Venice) by Giocondo

- 1505 – Archangel Cathedral in Moscow begun.
- 1505–1508 – Fondaco dei Tedeschi on the Grand Canal (Venice) rebuilt by Fra Giovanni Giocondo.
- 1506 – Construction of St. Peter's Basilica in Rome to the design of Bramante begins.
- 1507
  - Seville Cathedral consecrated.
  - Construction of the church of Santa Maria di Loreto, Rome, to the design of Antonio da Sangallo the Younger begins.
  - Rebuilding of Wawel Castle in Kraków begins.
- 1508
  - Church of San Rocco, Venice, designed by Bartolomeo Bon, begun in 1489, is completed.
  - Church of Santa Maria della Consolazione (Todi) is begun.
- 1509
  - Palazzo Loredan on the Grand Canal (Venice), begun by Mauro Codussi in 1481, is completed.
  - Fugger Chapel of St. Anne's Church, Augsburg, Swabia, is begun.

== Events ==
- 1503: November 1 – Pope Julius II becomes Pope; he will be patron to Bramante, Raphael, and Michelangelo.

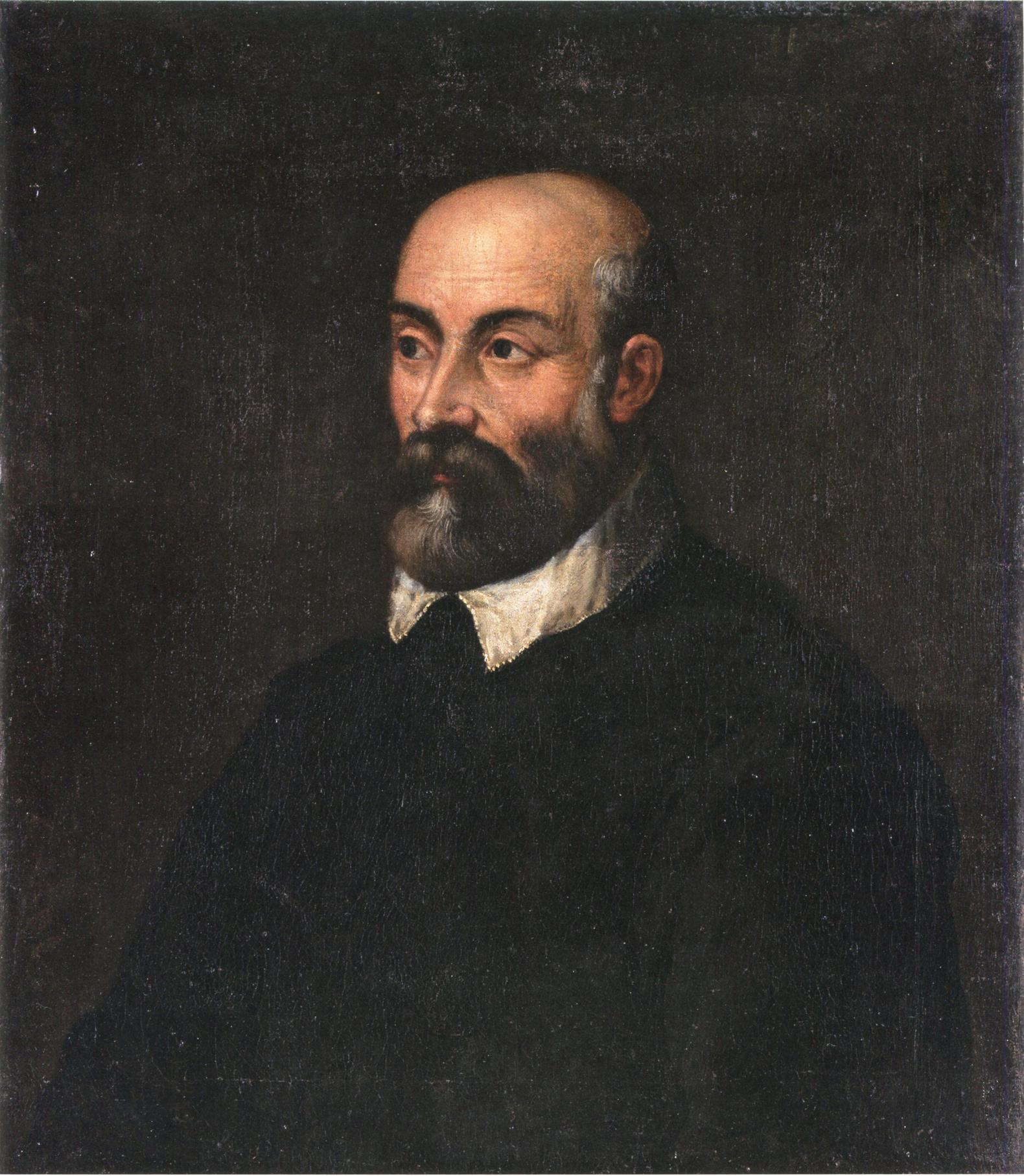
Andrea Palladio

== Births ==
- 1507: October 1 – Giacomo Barozzi da Vignola, Italian Mannerist architect (died 1573)
- 1508: November 30 – Andrea Palladio, Italian architect (died 1580)

== Deaths ==
- c. 1501 – Francesco di Giorgio Martini, Sienese painter, sculptor, architect and military engineer (born 1439)
- 1503: June 24 – Reginald Bray, English Chancellor of the Duchy of Lancaster and architect (born 1440)
- c. 1506/07 – Conrad Pflüger, Swabian architect (born c. 1450)
