= 1460s in architecture =

List of years in architecture	(table)
- … 1450; 1451; 1452; 1453; 1454; 1455; 1456; 1457; 1458; 1459; 1460; 1461; 1462; 1463; 1464; 1465; 1466; 1467; 1468; 1469; 1470 …
- Buildings and structures: Art; Archaeology; Architecture; Literature; Music; Philosophy; Science; +...

- 1450s
- 1460s in architecture
- 1470s
Other topics in 1460s:
- Art
- Music

== Buildings and structures ==
=== Buildings ===
- 1460
  - Palazzo Medici in Florence, designed by Michelozzo, is completed.
  - Porto Magna in Venetian Arsenal, perhaps built by Antonio Gambello from a design by Jacopo Bellini is constructed, the first neoclassical building in Venice.
- 1462 – Reconstruction of Basilica of Sant'Andrea, Mantua in Lombardy by Leon Battista Alberti begins.
- c. 1463 – Dardanelles fortresses of Kilitbahir Castle and Kale-i Sultaniye are built.
- 1463–67 – Fatih Mosque, Istanbul, designed by Atik Sinan, is constructed.

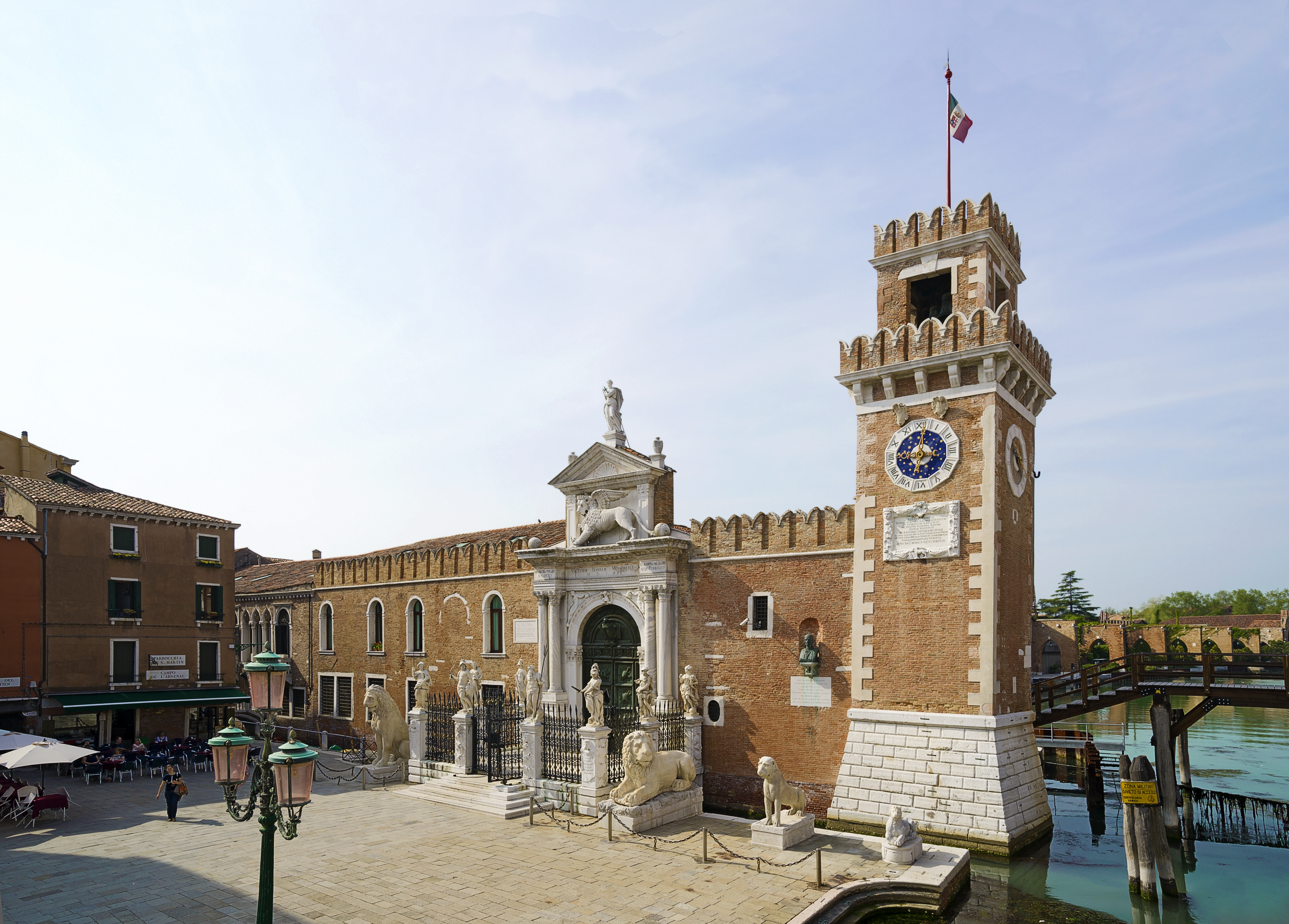
The Venetian Arsenal

- 1464 – Neemrana fort in India is begun.
- 1466 – Ockwells Manor in Berkshire, England, is completed.
- 1466–67 – Neubrügg covered wooden bridge over the Aare between Bern and Kirchlindach is erected.
- 1467 – Wongaksa Pagoda, Seoul, Korea, is built.
- 1468
  - Rebuilding of the Palazzo Ducale, Urbino, begun by Luciano Laurana.
  - Building of Basilica della Santa Casa, Loreto, Italy, begun by Giuliano da Maiano.
- 1469 – Kasımiye Medrese in Mardin, Turkey, begun before 1407, is completed.

== Events ==
- 1461: November 26 – 1461 L'Aquila earthquake in Italy; dome of Santa Maria di Collemaggio collapses for the first time.
- c.1464 – Filarete completes his Libro architettonico, a treatise on architecture and the ideal city of Sforzinda.

== Births ==
- c.1460
  - Benedetto Briosco, Italian sculptor and architect active in Lombardy (died 1514)
  - Marco Palmezzano, Italian painter and architect (died 1539)
  - Cristoforo Solari, Italian sculptor and architect (died 1527)
  - John Wastell, English architect and master mason (died 1518)
  - Bernardo Zenale, Italian painter and architect (died 1526)

== Deaths ==
- 1464 – Bernardo Rossellino, Florentine sculptor and architect (born 1409)
- 1466: December 13 – Donatello, Florentine sculptor (born 1386)
- c.1469 – Filarete, Florentine architect (born c.1400)
