= 1570s in architecture =

List of years in architecture	(table)
- … 1560; 1561; 1562; 1563; 1564; 1565; 1566; 1567; 1568; 1569; 1570; 1571; 1572; 1573; 1574; 1575; 1576; 1577; 1578; 1579; 1580 …
- Buildings and structures: Art; Archaeology; Architecture; Literature; Music; Philosophy; Science; +...

== Buildings and structures ==
=== Buildings ===
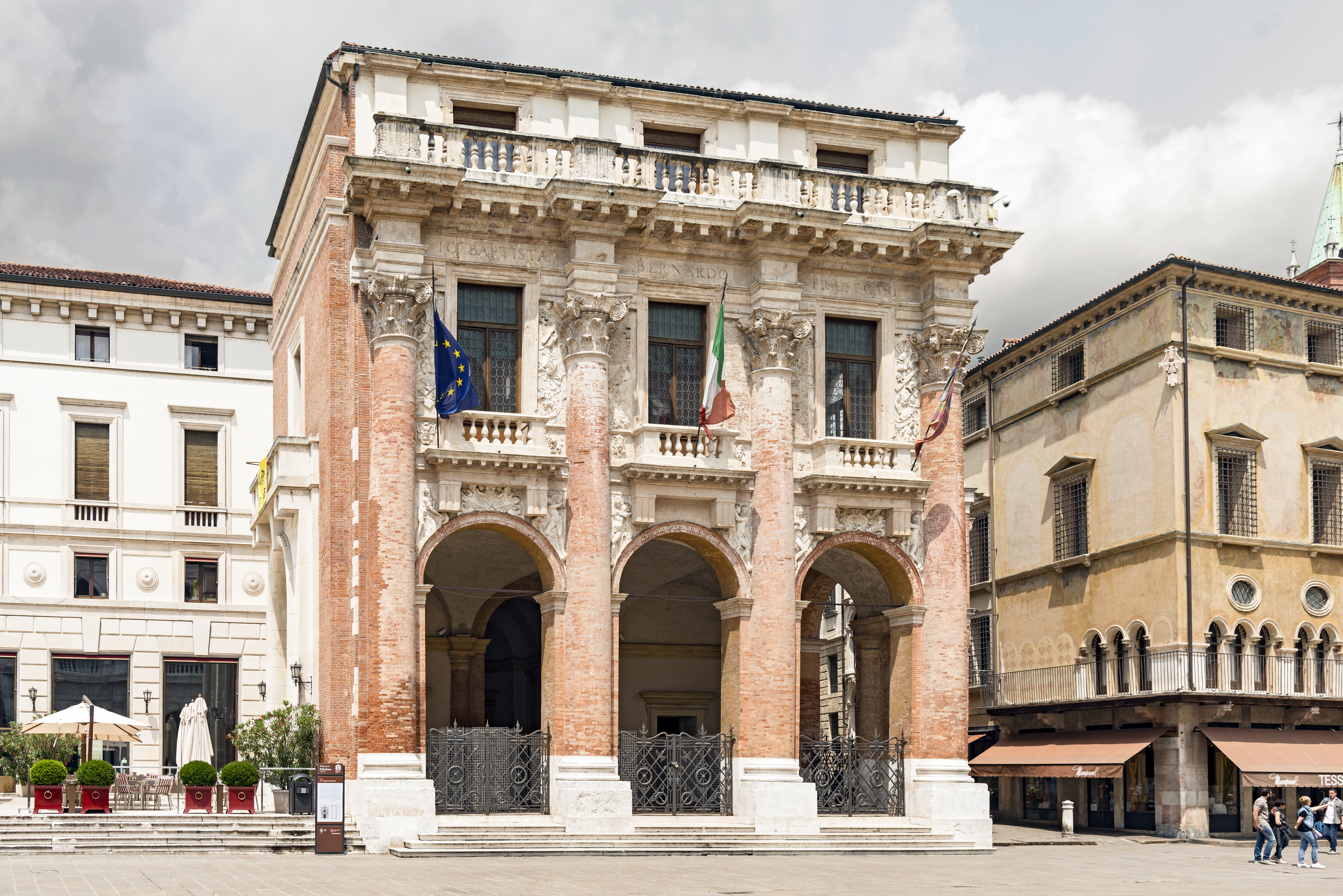
Palazzo del Capitaniato, Vicenza

- 1570–1575 – Palazzo Barbaran da Porto in Vicenza (in the Veneto), designed by Andrea Palladio, is built.
- 1571 – Buildings begun in 1568 are completed:
  - The Green Gate in Gdańsk, designed by Regnier (or Reiner) van Amsterdam.
  - The Hall of Antiquities (Antiquarium) in the Munich Residenz, designed by Wilhelm Egkl and Jacopo Strada.
- 1571–1572 – Loggia of Palazzo del Capitaniato in Vicenza, designed by Palladio, is built.
- 1572 – Humayun's Tomb in Delhi, designed by Mirak Mirza Ghiyas, is completed.
- c. 1572 – Completion of work (part of main courtyard) at Villa Serego, Santa Sofia di Pedemonte in the province of Verona, designed by Palladio.
- 1573 – Construction of Mexico City Cathedral begins.
- 1574
  - The Selimiye Mosque (Edirne), designed by Mimar Sinan and begun in 1568, is completed.
  - Rebuilding of Castle Ashby House in England is begun.
- 1576 – The Pagoda of Cishou Temple in the suburbs of Beijing is completed.
- 1576–1577 – Design for church of Il Redentore on Giudecca in Venice commissioned from Palladio and construction begins.
- 1577 – Mehmed Paša Sokolović Bridge over the Drina at Višegrad in the Ottoman Empire, designed by Mimar Sinan, is completed.
- 1579 – Nonsuch House erected on London Bridge.
- Fatehpur Sikri in the Mughal Empire is completed.

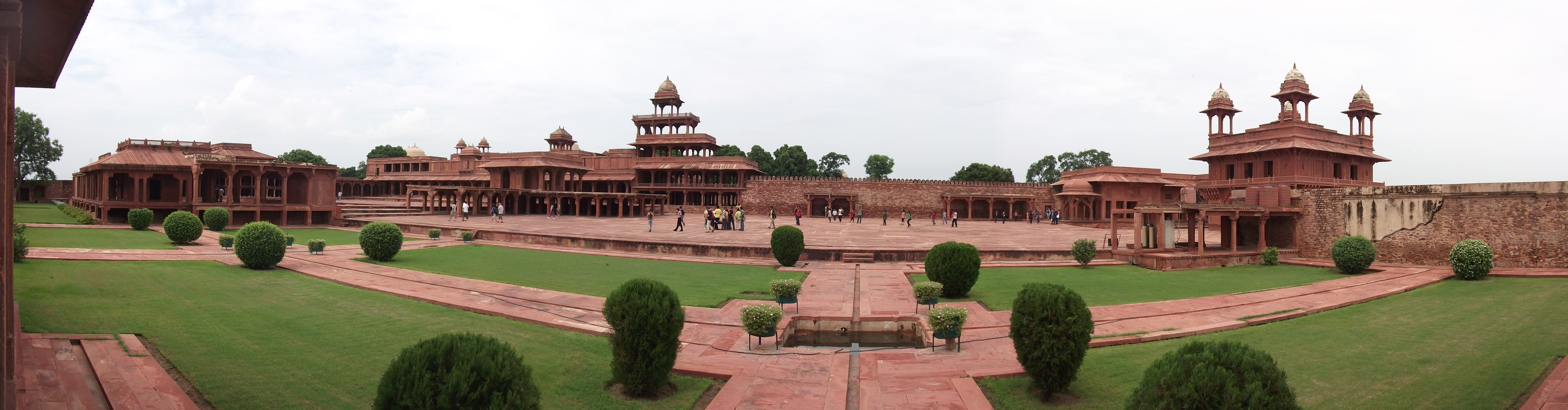
Fatehpur Sikri

== Events ==
- 1570 – Andrea Palladio publishes I Quattro Libri dell'Architettura (The Four Books of Architecture).
- 1573 – Philip II of Spain signs the Laws of the Indies which determine community planning in his overseas possessions.
- 1576–79 – Jacques I Androuet du Cerceau publishes Les plus excellents bastiments de France in Paris with engraved illustrations.
- 1578 – Giacomo della Porta builds a fountain in front of the Pantheon, Rome.

== Births ==
- 1571 – Salomon de Brosse, French architect (died 1626)
- 1573: July 15 – Inigo Jones, English architect and theatrical designer (died 1652)
- 1576 – Santino Solari, Italian-born architect (died 1646)

== Deaths ==
- 1570
  - January 8 – Philibert de l'Orme, French architect (born c. 1510)
  - October 20 – Francesco Laparelli, Italian architect and engineer (born 1521)
  - November 27 – Jacopo Sansovino, Italian architect and sculptor (born 1486)
- 1572: December 30 – Galeazzo Alessi, Italian architect (born 1512)
- 1573: July 7 – Giacomo Barozzi da Vignola, Italian mannerist architect (born 1507)
- 1574: June 27 – Giorgio Vasari, Italian painter, architect and art historian (born 1511)
- 1578: September – Pierre Lescot, French architect (born 1510)
