= 1580s in architecture =

List of years in architecture	(table)
- … 1570; 1571; 1572; 1573; 1574; 1575; 1576; 1577; 1578; 1579; 1580; 1581; 1582; 1583; 1584; 1585; 1586; 1587; 1588; 1589; 1590 …
- Buildings and structures: Art; Archaeology; Architecture; Literature; Music; Philosophy; Science; +...

== Buildings and structures ==
=== Buildings ===
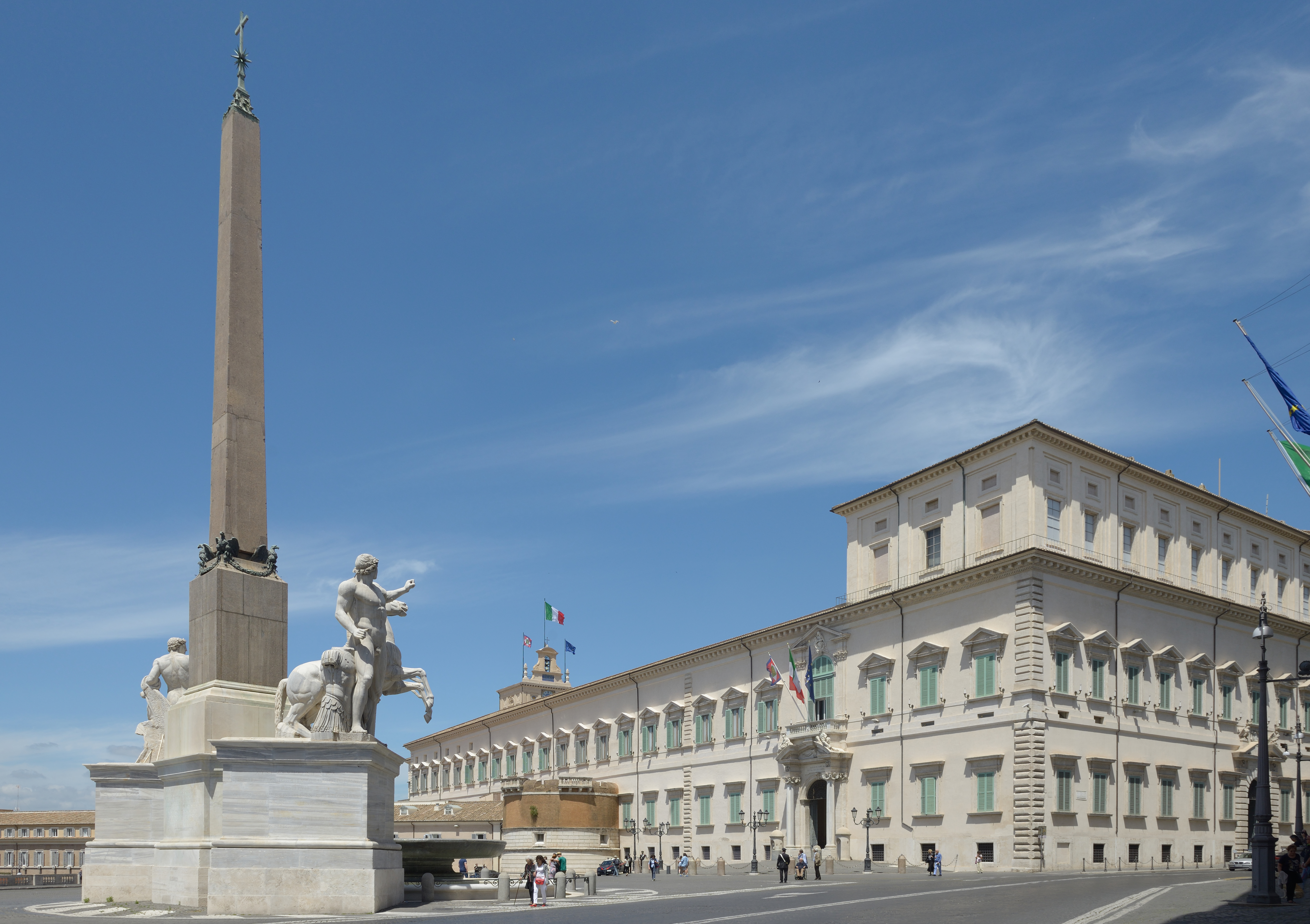
The Quirinal Palace in Rome, Italy

- 1580 – Old City of Zamość, designed by Bernardo Morando, is established in Poland.
- 1580–1588 – Wollaton Hall near Nottingham in England, probably designed by Robert Smythson, is built.
- 1581
  - Uffizi in Florence, designed by Giorgio Vasari and continued by Alfonso Parigi the Elder and Bernardo Buontalenti, is completed.
  - Litomyšl Castle in Bohemia, begun in 1568, is completed.
- c. 1582 – Dome and lantern of the church of Santa Maria di Loreto, Rome, completed by Giacomo del Duca.
- 1583
  - Allahabad Fort, built by Emperor Akbar, is completed.
  - Quirinal Palace in Rome, designed by Carlo Maderno and Domenico Fontana, is begun.
  - New Basilica of Our Lady of Humility, Pistoia, Tuscany, is consecrated.

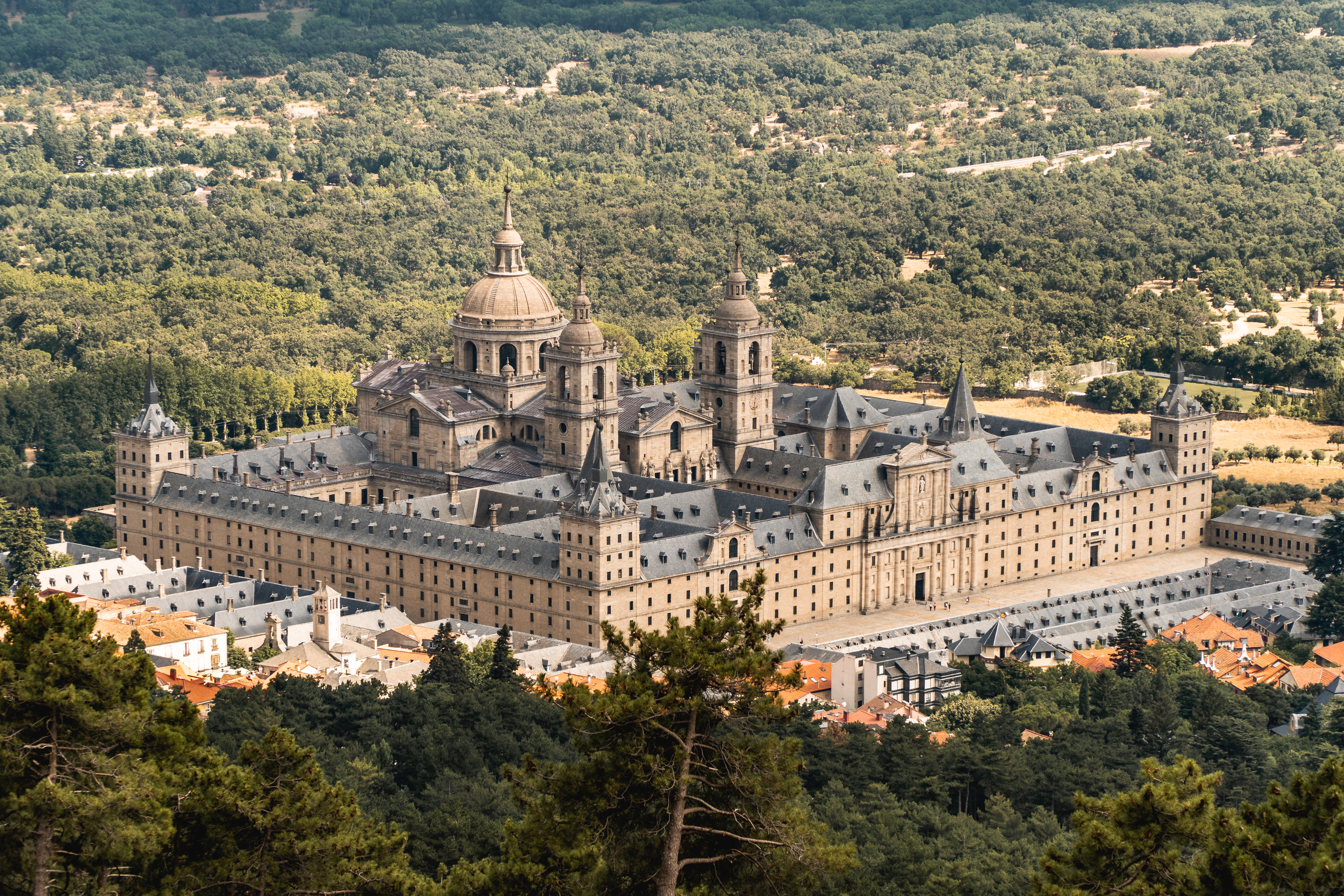
El Escorial

- 1584
  - El Escorial palace at San Lorenzo de El Escorial, Spain (begun 1563), designed by Juan de Herrera, is completed.
  - Church of the Gesù in Rome, designed by Giacomo Barozzi da Vignola in 1568 and completed by Giacomo della Porta with "the first truly baroque façade", is consecrated.
- 1585 – Teatro Olimpico, Vicenza, designed by Palladio, and completed by Vincenzo Scamozzi, is opened.
- 1585 – Neubau in Strasbourg, begun in 1582, is inaugurated.
- 1586 – Golden Tea Room first recorded in use in Japan.
- 1587–1588 – Fort Al Jalali at Muscat, Oman, is built by Portuguese naval captain Belchior Calaça.
- 1588
  - Court theatre at Sabbioneta, designed by Vincenzo Scamozzi, is begun (completed 1590.)
  - Roselius-Haus in Bremen is completed.
  - Villa Barbarigo, Noventa Vicentina is commissioned.

== Publications ==
- 1584 – Gian Paolo Lomazzo produces his treatise Trattato dell'arte della pittura, scoltura et architettura.

== Births ==
- 1585 – Pietro Paolo Floriani, Italian architect and engineer (died 1638)
- 1586–1587 – Nicholas Stone, English sculptor and architect (died 1647)
- 1587
  - Fabio Mangone, Italian architect (died 1629)
  - Hans van Steenwinckel the Younger, Flemish/Danish architect (died 1639)

== Deaths ==
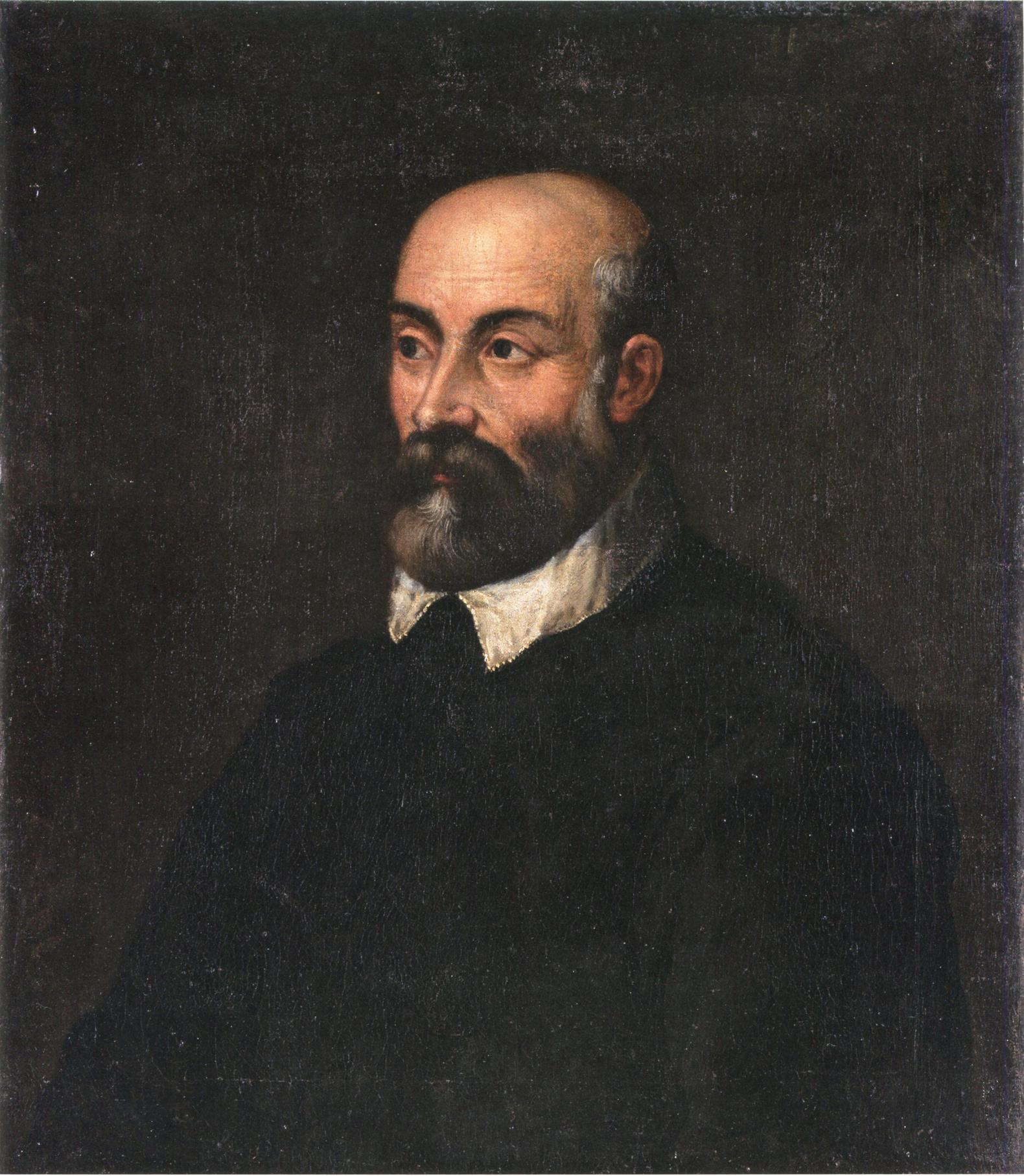
Andrea Palladio

- 1580: August 19 – Andrea Palladio, Italian architect (born 1508)
- 1583: October 30 – Pirro Ligorio, Italian architect, painter, antiquarian and garden designer (born 1510)
- 1588: July 17 – Mimar Sinan, Ottoman architect (born 1489)
