= 19th century BC in architecture =

== Buildings and structures ==
=== Buildings ===
- c. 1860 BC, construction of the Ancient Egyptian fortress at Buhen
- Nuraghe Santu Antine

== See also ==
- 19th century BC
- 18th century BC in architecture
- Timeline of architecture
