= 1400s in architecture =

List of years in architecture	(table)
- … 1390; 1391; 1392; 1393; 1394; 1395; 1396; 1397; 1398; 1399; 1400; 1401; 1402; 1403; 1404; 1405; 1406; 1407; 1408; 1409; 1410 …
- Buildings and structures: Art; Archaeology; Architecture; Literature; Music; Philosophy; Science; +...

- 1390s
- 1400s in architecture
- 1410s
Other topics in 1400s:
- Art

== Buildings and structures ==
=== Buildings ===
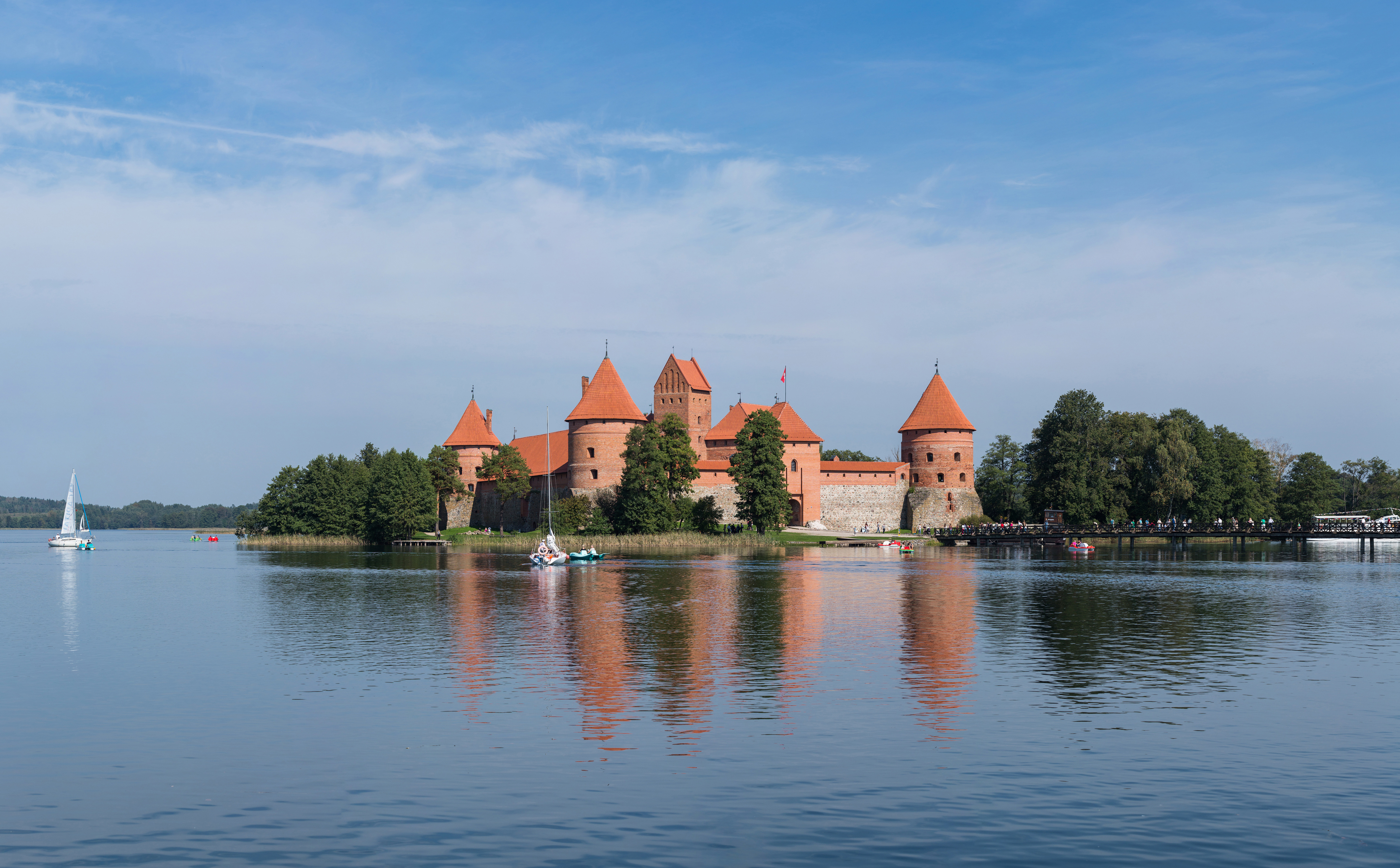
Trakai Island Castle

- 1402 – Seville Cathedral is begun.
- 1402 – Charles Bridge in Prague, Czech Republic is completed.
- 1403
  - The Gur-e-Amir Mausoleum in Samarkand is begun on the orders of Timur.
  - The City God Temple of Shanghai is built.
- 1405
  - The Changdeokgung of Korea is completed.
  - Construction of new Mausoleum of Khoja Ahmed Yasawi in Turkistan (Timurid Empire) ceases.
- 1407 – Swalcliffe Tithe Barn in Oxfordshire, England, is completed.
- 1409
  - The Upper Castle in Vilnius in Lithuania is completed.
  - The Trakai Island Castle at Trakai in Lithuania is completed.

== Births ==
- c. 1400 – Filarete, born Antonio di Pietro Averlino, Florentine architect (died c. 1469)
- 1404: February 14 – Leon Battista Alberti, Italian architect and polymath (died 1472)

== Deaths ==
- 1400: August 21 – Henry Yevele, English master mason (born c. 1320)
