= 1650s in architecture =

List of years in architecture	(table)
- … 1640; 1641; 1642; 1643; 1644; 1645; 1646; 1647; 1648; 1649; 1650; 1651; 1652; 1653; 1654; 1655; 1656; 1657; 1658; 1659; 1660 …
- Buildings and structures: Art; Archaeology; Architecture; Literature; Music; Philosophy; Science; +...

== Buildings and structures ==
=== Buildings ===
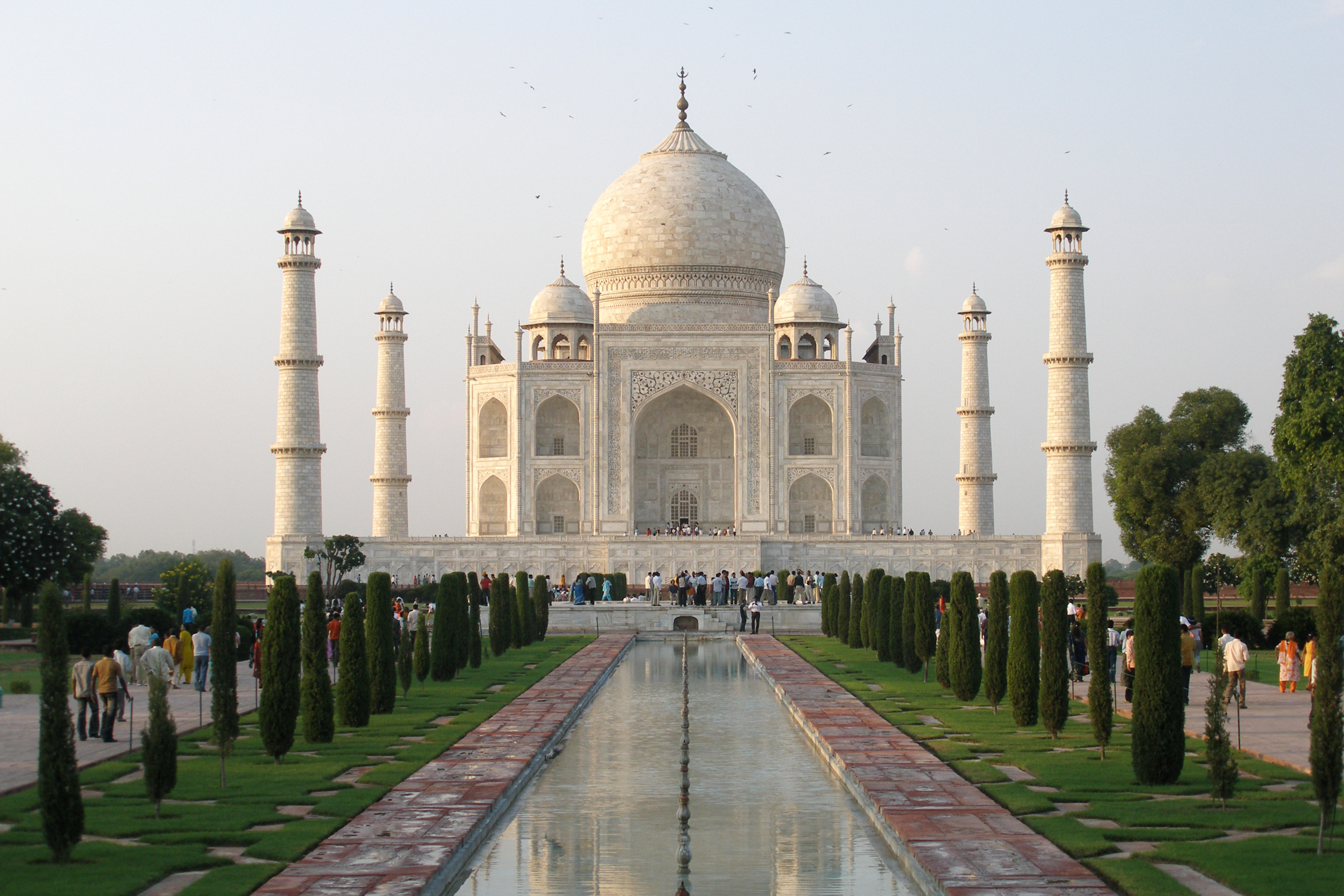
Taj Mahal completed

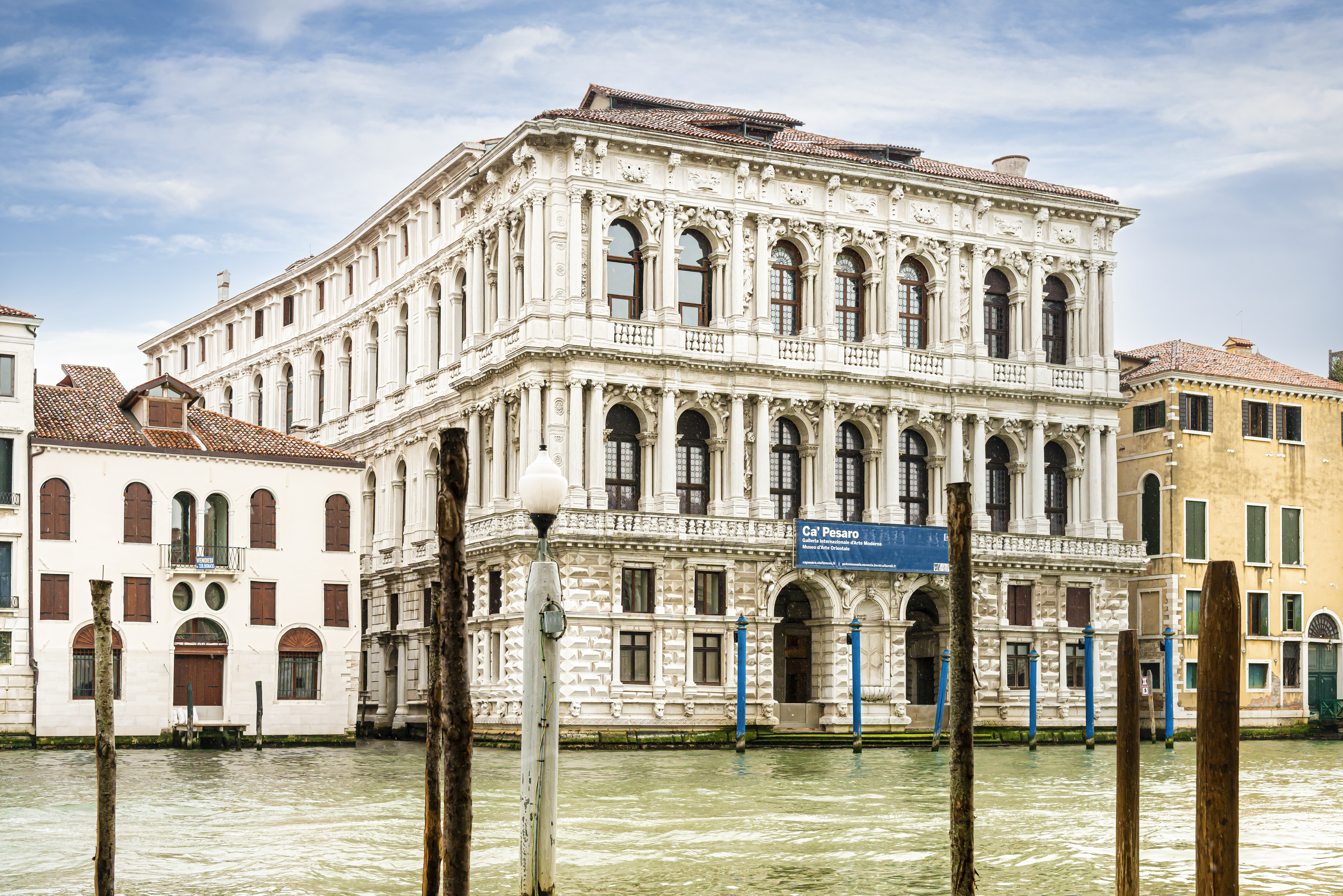
Ca' Pesaro on the Grand Canal (Venice)

- 1650
  - The Marian column in Prague is erected (destroyed 1918).
  - Talar Ashraf palace in Isfahan, Persia, is built.
  - (approximate date) The Khaju Bridge in Isfahan is built.
- 1651
  - Collegiate Church of Saint Magdalena and Saint Stanisław in Poznań (Poland) is started (completed c.1701).
  - Karamon of Ueno Tōshō-gū shrine in Tokyo is built.
- 1652 – Church of the Resurrection, Kostroma.
- 1653
  - The Taj Mahal mausoleum at Agra in India (begun in 1630 and probably designed by Ustad Ahmad Lahauri) is completed.
  - The Radziwiłł Palace, Vilnius, is completed.
- 1654 – Construction of Skokloster Castle in Sweden to the design of Caspar Vogel begins (completed 1676).
- 1656
  - The Jama Masjid, Delhi, is completed.
  - The colonnade of St. Peter's Basilica in Rome is started by Gian Lorenzo Bernini.
- 1658
  - Terraced houses at 52–55 Newington Green in London, perhaps by Thomas Pidcock, are completed.
  - St Nicholas Abbey (plantation house) in Saint Peter, Barbados, is begun.
- 1659
  - Trashigang Dzong in Bhutan is built.
  - Ca' Pesaro on the Grand Canal (Venice) is started by Baldassarre Longhena (completed 1710).
  - Saleh Kamboh Mosque in Lahore is founded.
  - Tomb of Nadira Begum in Lahore is started.

== Births ==
- 1650: December 1 (bapt.) – William Talman, English architect, landscape designer and collector (died 1719)
- 1651: March 2 – Carlo Gimach, Maltese architect, engineer and poet (died 1730)
- 1651: September 3 – Roger North, English lawyer, biographer and amateur of the arts (died 1734)
- 1654: May 23 – Nicodemus Tessin the Younger, Swedish baroque architect (died 1728)
- 1655: July 7 – Christoph Dientzenhofer, Bavarian baroque architect (died 1722)
- 1656: July 20 – Johann Bernhard Fischer von Erlach, Austrian baroque architect (died 1723)

== Deaths ==
- 1652: June 21 – Inigo Jones, English architect and theatrical designer (born 1573)
- 1655: July 15 – Girolamo Rainaldi, Italian architect (born 1570)
