= 1540s in architecture =

List of years in architecture	(table)
- … 1530; 1531; 1532; 1533; 1534; 1535; 1536; 1537; 1538; 1539; 1540; 1541; 1542; 1543; 1544; 1545; 1546; 1547; 1548; 1549; 1550 …
- Buildings and structures: Art; Archaeology; Architecture; Literature; Music; Philosophy; Science; +...

- 1530s
- 1540s in architecture
- 1550s
Other topics in 1540s:
- Music

== Events ==
- 1545 – Part of the Biblioteca Marciana in Venice collapses, causing the architect, Jacopo Sansovino, to be imprisoned briefly.
- 1546 – Michelangelo Buonarroti is made chief architect of St. Peter's Basilica in Rome.
- 1549 – The spire of Lincoln Cathedral in England is blown down.

== Buildings and structures ==
=== Buildings ===
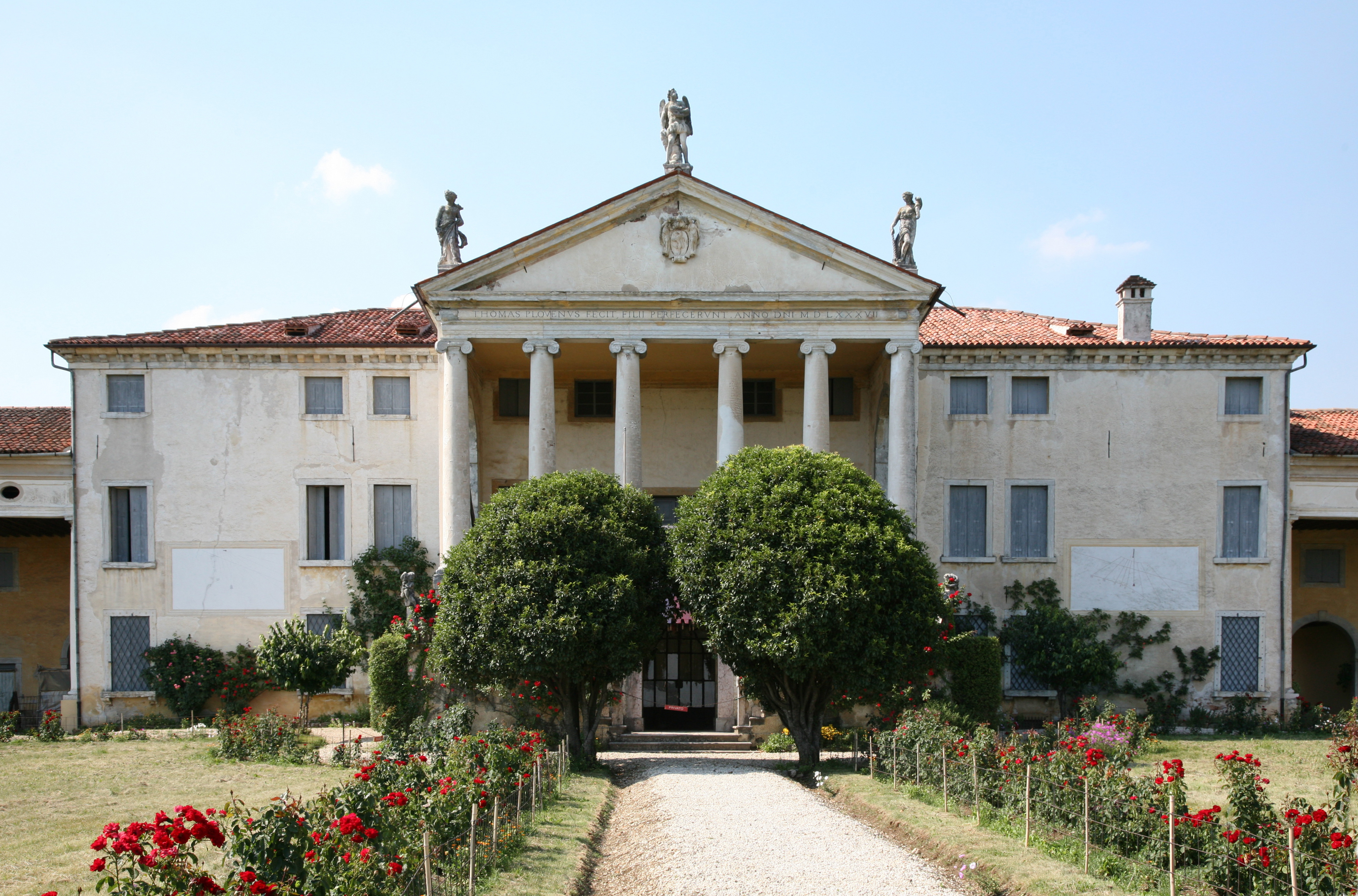
Villa Piovene in Lonedo di Lugo, northern Italy

- 1540
  - Kamran's Baradari in Lahore completed
  - Approximate date of completion of some of the Device Forts on the coast of England: Calshot, Deal, Sandgate, Sandown and Walmer Castles
  - Approximate date of the construction of Santa Cecilia Chapel in Għajnsielem, Gozo, Malta
- c. 1541
  - Portland Castle on the Isle of Portland, England, completed
  - Qila-i-Kuhna Mosque in the Purana Qila in Delhi completed
- 1541–1544 – Old Hall of Berkhamsted School in England built
- 1542
  - Andrea Palladio completes his first commission at Villa Godi, first of his Palladian villas of Veneto; the neighbouring Villa Piovene is completed at about the same time
  - Church of Saint Lucius, designed by Tommaso Rodari in the style of Bramante, is completed at its original location in Lugano, Switzerland
  - Approximate date of completion of more of the Device Forts on the coast of England: Pendennis and St Mawes Castles in Cornwall, East Cowes Castle on the Isle of Wight and Sandsfoot Castle at Weymouth, Dorset

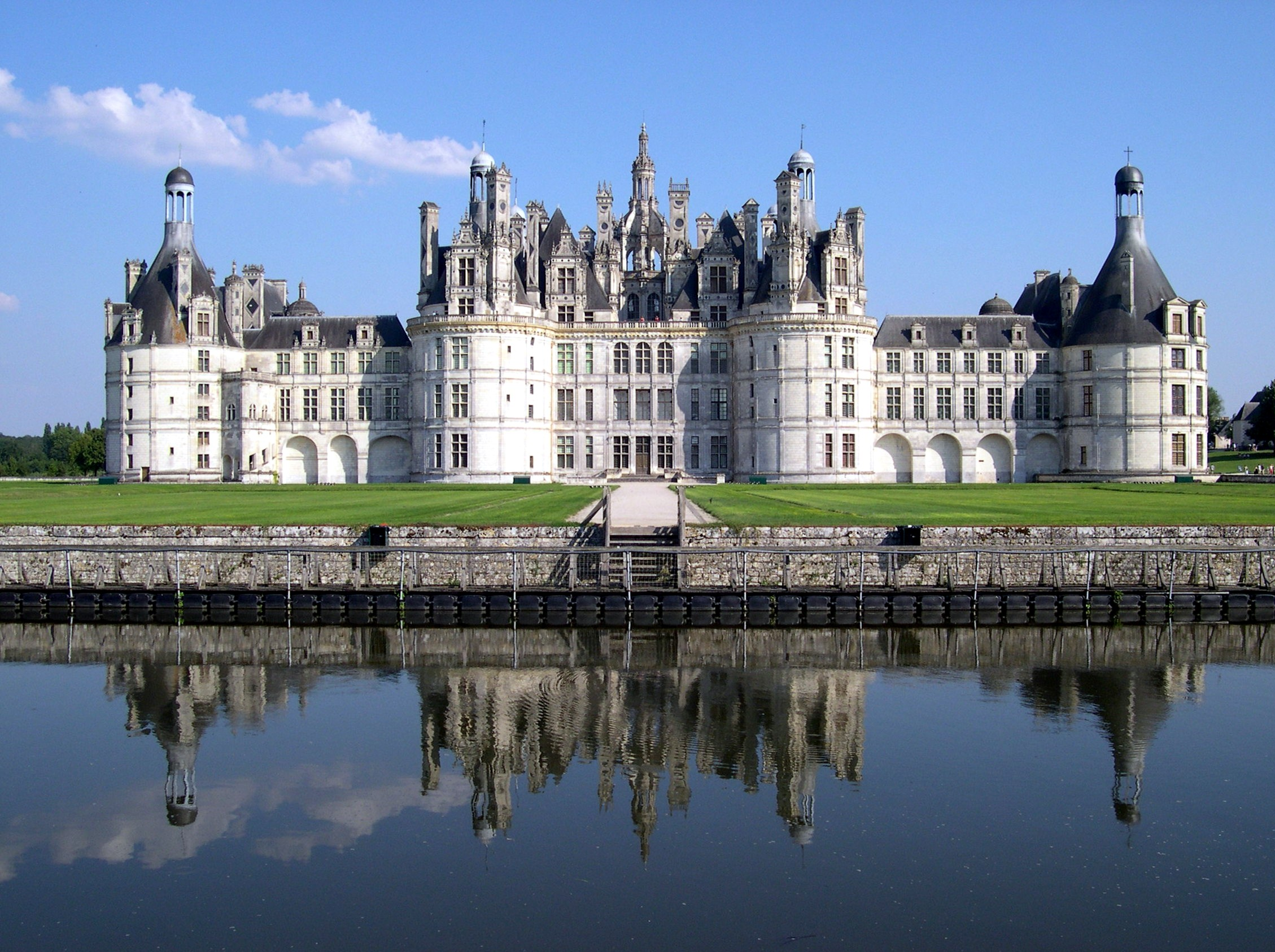
Château de Chambord

- 1543 – Lighthouse of Genoa completed in surviving form
- 1543–1548 – Mimar Sinan builds his first significant architectural commission, Şehzade Mosque in Istanbul.
- 1544 – King's College Chapel, Cambridge completed
- 1544–1549 – Xuanfu–Datong section of Ming Great Wall of China constructed
- c. 1546 – Loggetta del Sansovino of St Mark's Campanile in Piazza San Marco, Venice, designed by Jacopo Sansovino, is completed
- 1547
  - Construction of the Château de Chambord ceases on the death of Francis I of France
  - Yarmouth Castle on the Isle of Wight is completed
- 1548–1549 – Villa Pojana, one of the Palladian villas of Veneto, is built.

== Births ==
- c.1540 – Sedefkar Mehmed Agha, Ottoman architect (died 1617)
- 1548: September 2 – Vincenzo Scamozzi, Italian architect (died 1616)

== Deaths ==
- 1543: June 25 – Giovanni Mangone, Italian sculptor, architect, military engineer and antiquarian
- 1546
  - August 3 – Antonio da Sangallo the Younger, Italian architect (born 1484)
  - November 1 – Giulio Romano, Italian painter and architect (born c. 1449)
