= 1640s in architecture =

| List of years in architecture | (table) |
- … 1630; 1631; 1632; 1633; 1634; 1635; 1636; 1637; 1638; 1639; 1640; 1641; 1642; 1643; 1644; 1645; 1646; 1647; 1648; 1649; 1650 …
- Buildings and structures: Art; Archaeology; Architecture; Literature; Music; Philosophy; Science; +...

== Buildings and structures ==
=== Buildings ===
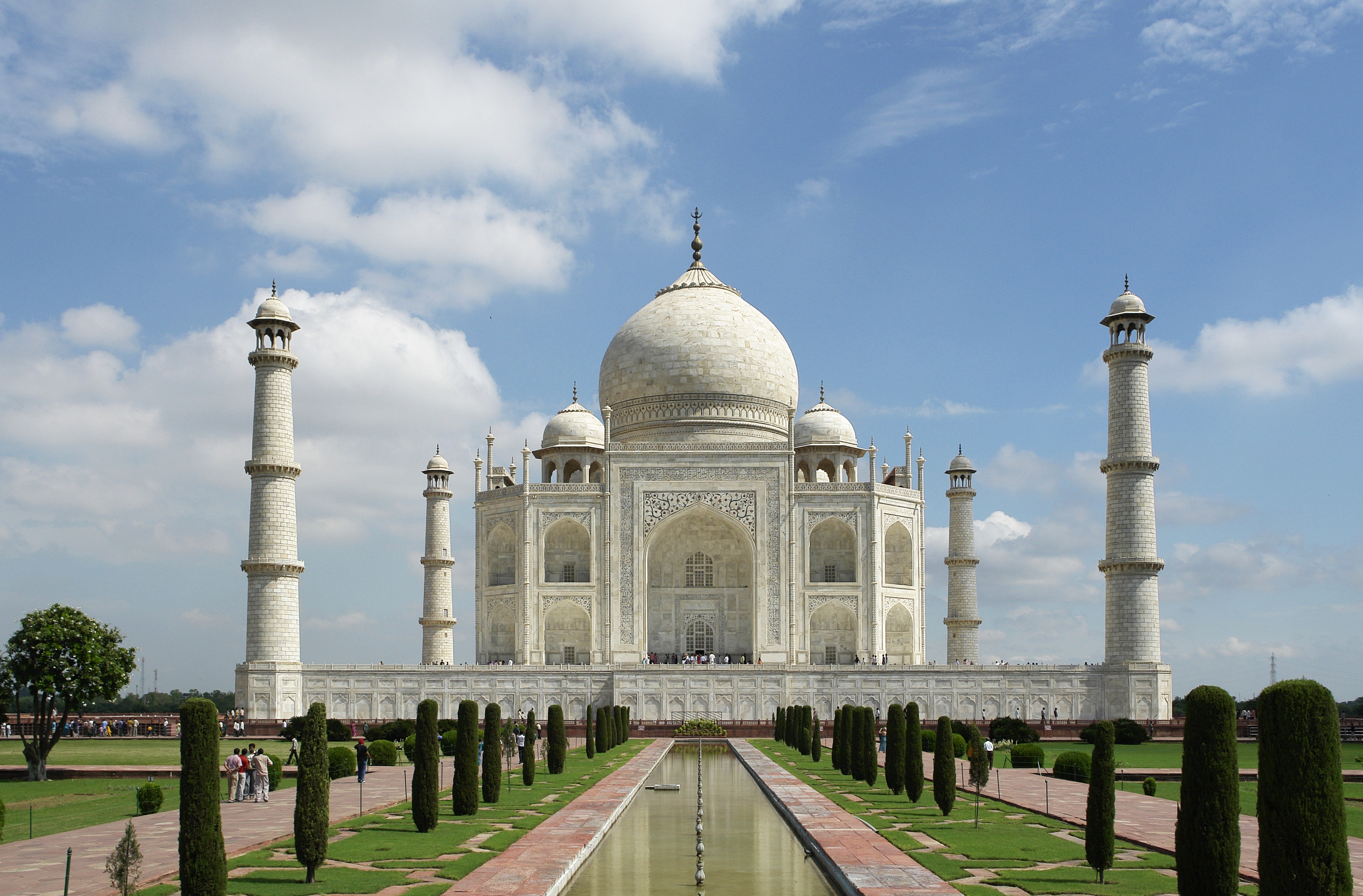
The Taj Mahal in Agra, India

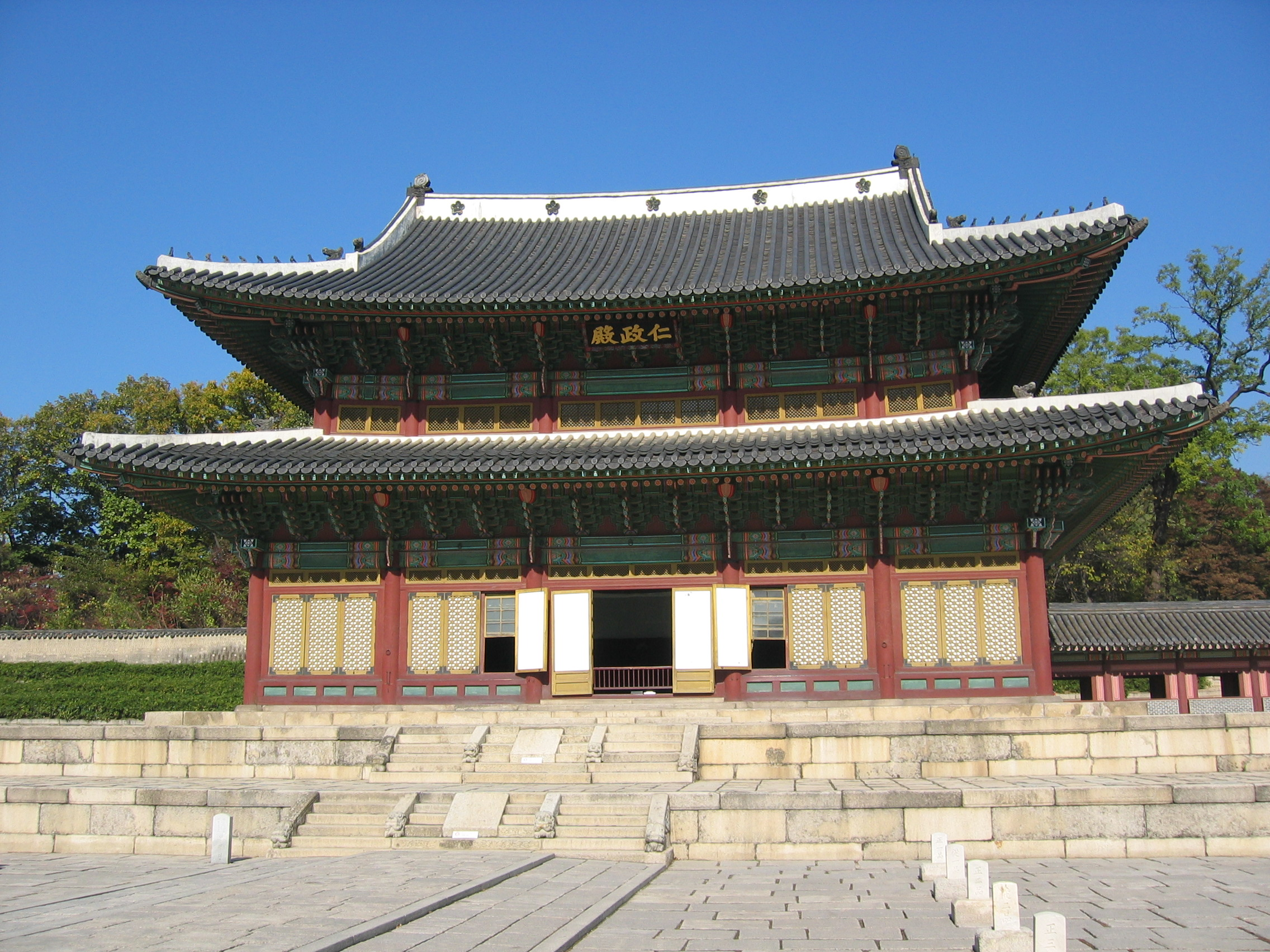
The Changdeokgung in Seoul, Korea

- The Taj Mahal in Agra, India, is under construction, probably by Ustad Ahmad Lahori, to a commission by Shah Jahan. The mosque and jawab in the complex are completed in 1643.
- 1640
  - Børsen in Copenhagen, designed by Lorentz and Hans van Steenwinckel the Younger and begun in 1619, is completed.
  - 59–60 Lincoln's Inn Fields, London (later known as Lindsey House), probably designed by Inigo Jones and begun about 1638, is completed.
  - Butterwalk, Dartmouth, England, is completed.
- 1641
  - Tron Kirk in Edinburgh, Scotland, designed by John Mylne, is dedicated.
  - The Mauritshuis at The Hague in the Dutch Republic, designed by Jacob van Campen and Pieter Post, is completed.
- 1645–1648 – Main structure of Potala Palace in Lhasa, Tibet, is built.
- 1646
  - The St. Mary Magdalene Chapel, Dingli, Malta, is rebuilt after the original chapel had collapsed.
  - Chehel Sotoun in Isfahan, Persia, is completed.
  - New Church of Saint-Sulpice, Paris, is begun to designs of 1636 by Christophe Gamard; it will not be completed until the later 18th century.
- 1647 – The Changdeokgung in Seoul, Korea, is reconstructed.
- 1648 – Buildings commissioned by Shah Jahan in India:
  - April 6: Red Fort, Delhi, is completed to designs by Ustad Ahmad Lahori.
  - Jama Mosque, Agra, is built.

== Births ==
- 1642 – Giovanni Barbara, Maltese architect and military engineer (died 1728)
- c.1645 – William Winde, English gentleman architect (died 1722)
- 1645: December 27 – Giovanni Antonio Viscardi, Swiss baroque architect working in Bavaria (died 1713)
- 1646: April 16 – Jules Hardouin Mansart, French baroque architect (died 1708)
- 1647 – Henry Aldrich, English polymath and amateur architect (died 1710)
- 1648 – Pietro Perti, Ticinese architect and sculptor working in Lithuania (died 1714)

== Deaths ==
- 1646: April 10 – Santino Solari, Italian-born architect working in Salzburg (born 1576)
- 1647: August 24 – Nicholas Stone, English sculptor and architect (born 1586/7)
