= William Smyth (architect) =

English gothic architect

William Smyth (fl. 1465 – died 1490) was an English gothic architect responsible for the work including the fan vaults at Wells Cathedral, Sherborne Abbey and Milton Abbey. He may also have been the architect of the Church of St Bartholomew, Crewkerne.
