= 1410s in architecture =

- 1400s
- 1410s in architecture
- 1420s
Other topics in 1410s:
- Art
- Music

Architecture timeline

== Buildings and structures ==
=== Buildings ===
- 1410
  - In Prague, at the Old Town Hall, the Astronomical Clock (Orloj) is built.
  - In Heidelberg, Germany: the Heiliggeistkirche is begun, but the nave takes until 1441 to complete.
  - In Kościan (Poland), the monastery and Mary Magdalene and St Nicolas church are built, with the consent of the King of Poland Władysław Jagiełło.

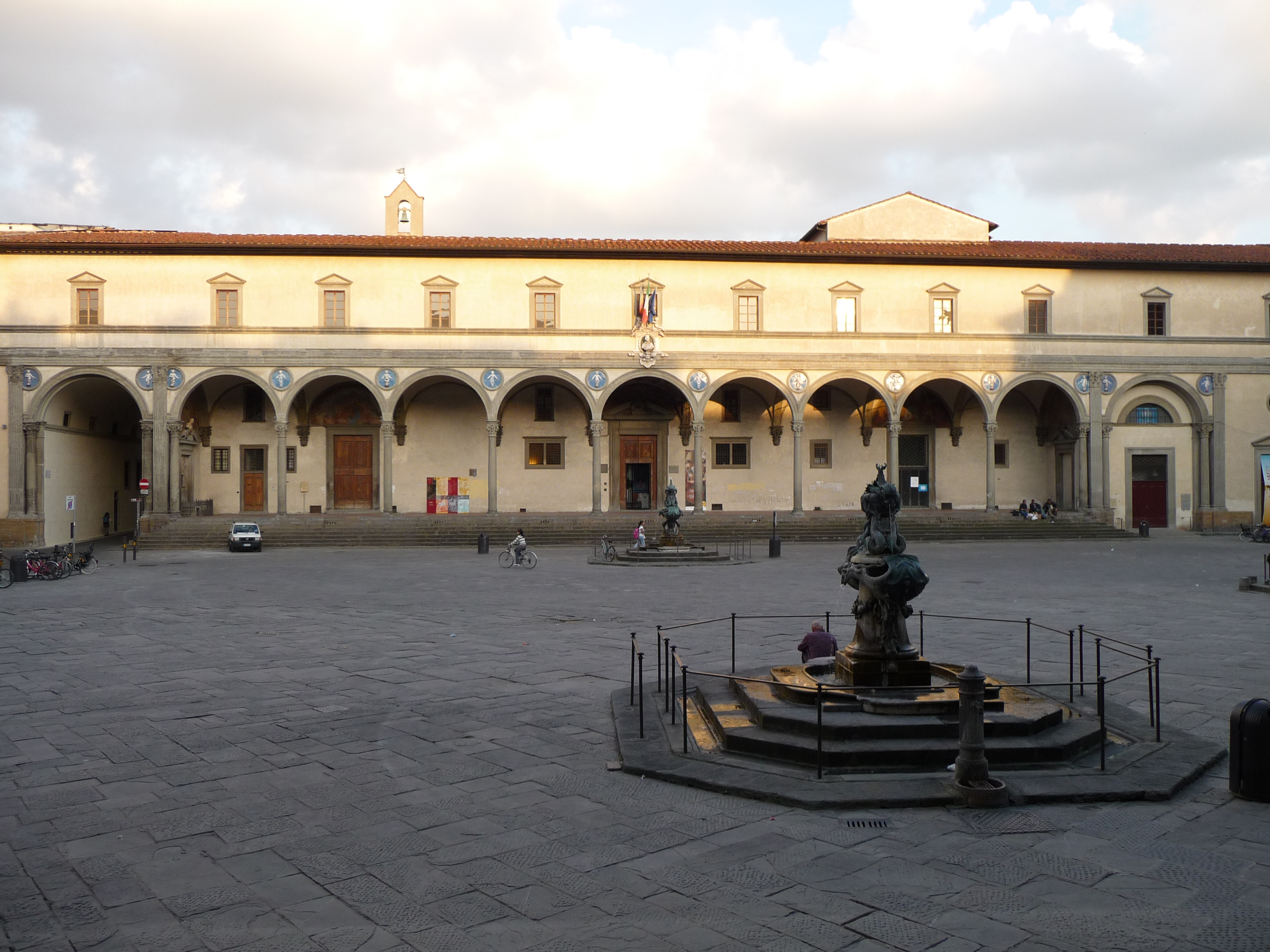
Ospedale degli Innocenti, Florence

- 1411
  - In England, construction of the Guildhall, London, is begun.
  - In the Electorate of Saxony, the church of St. Moritz, Halle, is consecrated.
- 1412 – At Seoul in the Korean kingdom of Joseon, the original Changdeokgung palace is completed.
- 1413 – In Dubingiai (Lithuania), a new masonry castle by Vytautas the Great is built.
- 1418 – Brunelleschi and Ghiberti submit plans for the dome of Florence Cathedral.
- 1419
  - Brunelleschi designs the loggia of the Ospedale degli Innocenti in Florence.
  - The Jiqinglou Fujian tulou in Ming dynasty China is built.

== Deaths ==
- 1411 – Jacques Coene, Flemish painter, illustrator and architect
