= 6th century BC in architecture =

== Buildings ==
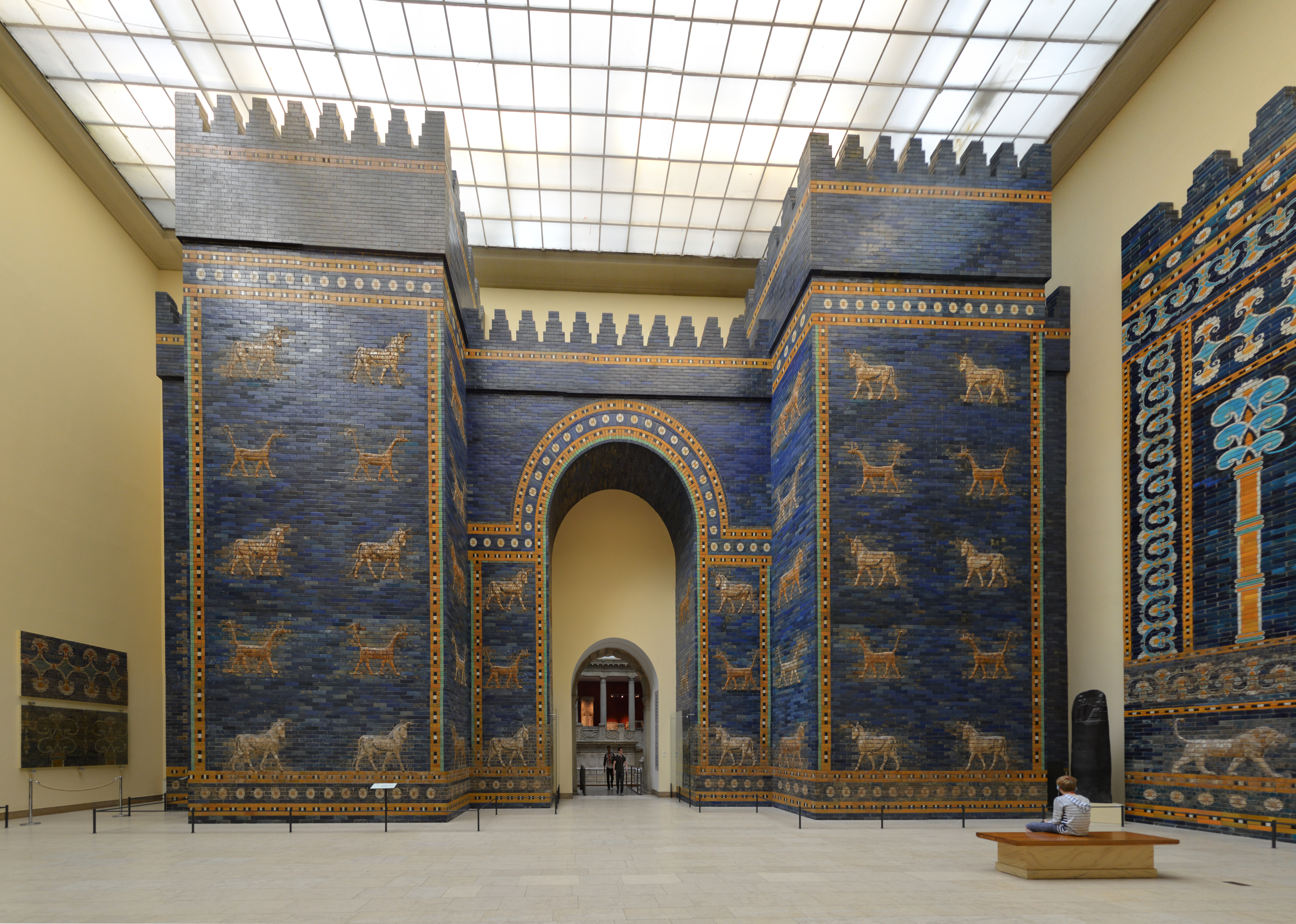
Reconstruction of Ishtar Gate in the Pergamon Museum, Berlin

Dates approximate

- 575 – Ishtar Gate in Babylon constructed.
- 530 – Ennigaldi-Nanna's museum established
- 520 – Temple of Olympian Zeus, Athens, begun (completed 132 CE).
- 515 – Construction of Persepolis, capital of the Achaemenid Empire, begins.
- 500:
  - Temple of Athena (Paestum) in Campania constructed.
  - The Magadha imperial capital of Pataliputra (modern day Patna) in the Indian subcontinent is begun with construction of a small fort (Pāṭaligrama) near the Ganges.
