= 1470s in architecture =

List of years in architecture	(table)
- … 1460; 1461; 1462; 1463; 1464; 1465; 1466; 1467; 1468; 1469; 1470; 1471; 1472; 1473; 1474; 1475; 1476; 1477; 1478; 1479; 1480 …
- Buildings and structures: Art; Archaeology; Architecture; Literature; Music; Philosophy; Science; +...

- 1460s
- 1470s in architecture
- 1480s
Other topics in 1470s:
- Art
- Music

Architecture timeline

== Buildings and structures ==
=== Buildings ===
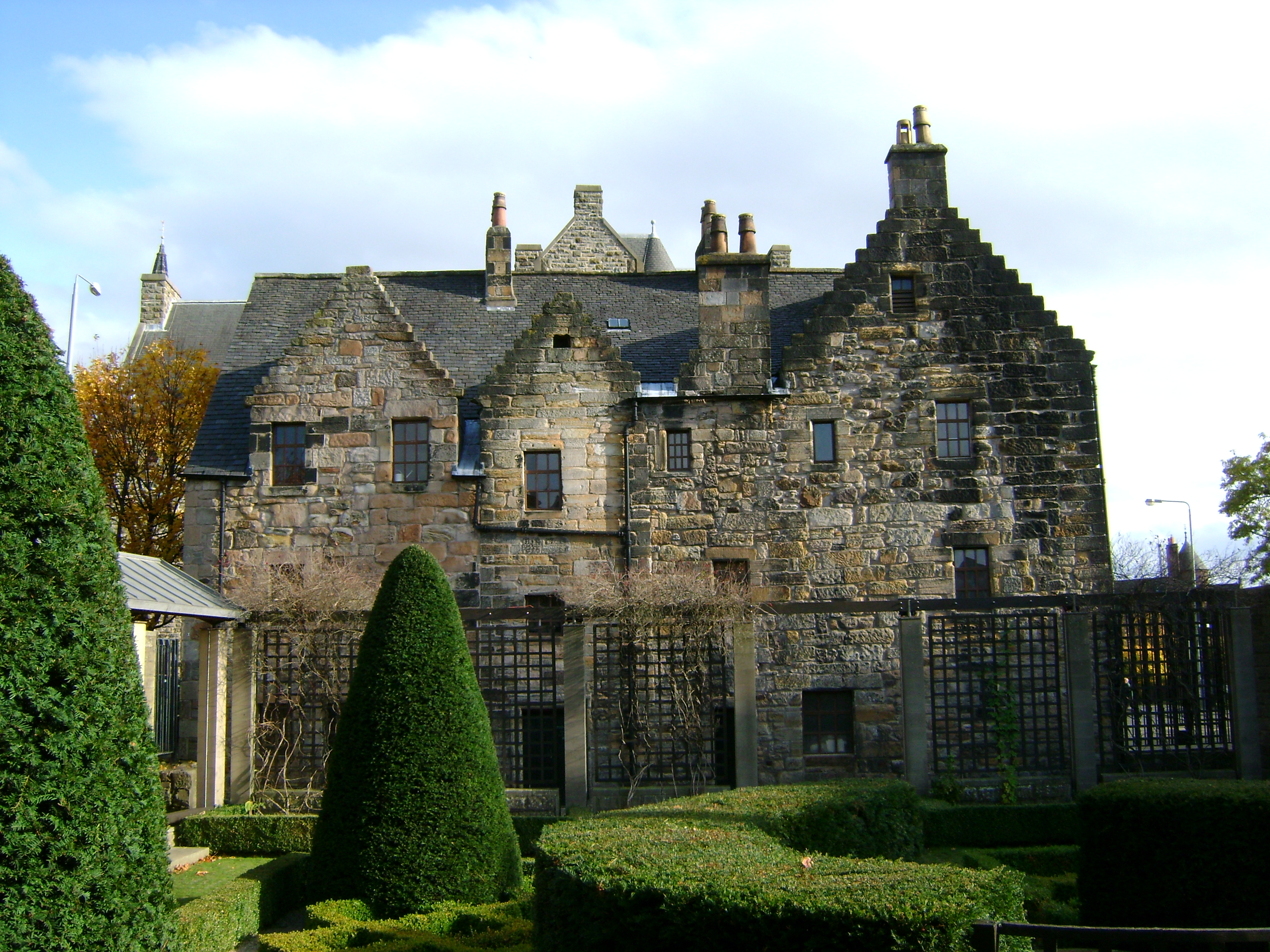
Provand's Lordship

- 1470 – Church and lighthouse tower, Westkapelle, Walcheren, completed
- 1471 – Provand's Lordship, Glasgow, Scotland, built.
- 1472–1474 – The Ordos Wall, first substantial section of the Ming Great Wall of China, built
- 1473 – Work on Cologne Cathedral west front and towers suspended until 19th century
- 1474 – Nave vault of St. Stephen's Cathedral, Vienna, completed
- 1475–1479 – Dormition Cathedral, Moscow, designed by Aristotele Fioravanti, built
- 1479 – Munich Frauenkirche completed by Jörg von Halsbach

== Births ==
- 1475: March 6 – Michelangelo, born Michelangelo di Lodovico Buonarroti Simoni in Caprese, Tuscany, Italian sculptor, painter, architect, poet and engineer (died 1564)
- 1475: September 6 – Sebastiano Serlio born in Bologna, Italian Mannerist architect and theoretician working in France (died c. 1554)

== Deaths ==
- 1472: April 25 – Leon Battista Alberti, Italian architect and polymath (born 1404)
- 1472? – Michelozzo, Florentine architect and sculptor (born c. 1396)
