= 2nd century in architecture =

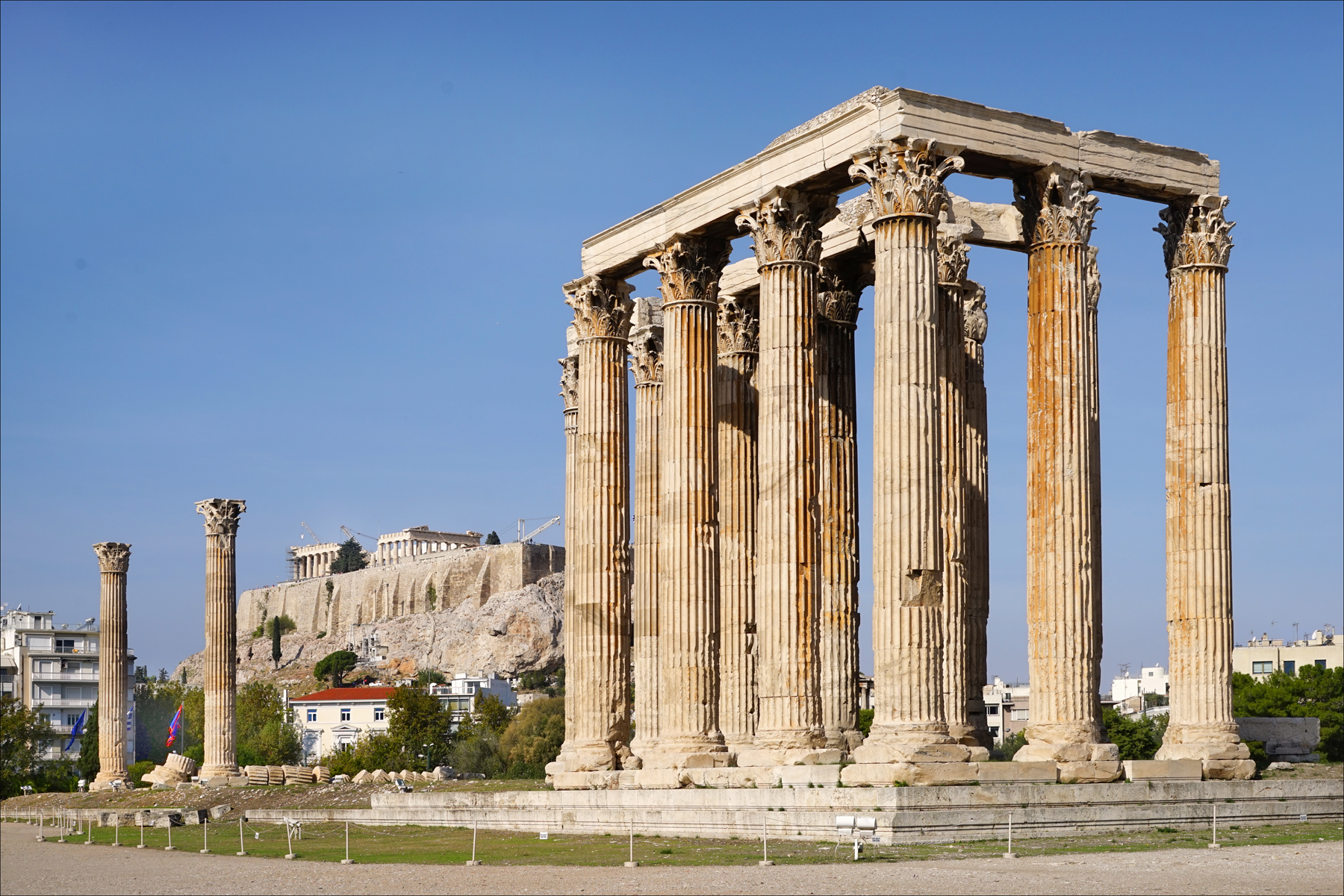
Temple of Olympian Zeus, Athens

- 104–106 – Alcántara Bridge across the Tagus is Spain is built by order of Trajan.
- 113 – Trajan's Column in Rome is completed.
- 122 – Construction of Hadrian's Wall in Britain begun.
- c. 128 – Pantheon in Rome is completed.
- 129/130 – Arch of Hadrian in modern Jerash, Jordan is completed.
- 132 – Temple of Olympian Zeus, Athens, begun around 520 BC, is completed.
- 134 – Ponte Sant'Angelo in Rome is completed.
- 180–200 – Porta Nigra in Trier, Germania, is constructed.
- year unknown – Kallanai Dam (Grand Anaicut) in Tamil Nadu is completed.
