= 26th century BC in architecture =

== Buildings and structures ==
=== Buildings ===
- c. 2580 BC the Pyramid of Khufu, the oldest and largest of the three great pyramids in the Giza Necropolis, is completed
- c. 2532 BC the Pyramid of Khafre, in the Giza Necropolis, is completed
- the Pyramid of Menkaure, in the Giza Necropolis, is completed
- the Great Sphinx of Giza is completed

== See also ==
- Timeline of architecture
