= 1480s in architecture =

List of years in architecture	(table)
- … 1470; 1471; 1472; 1473; 1474; 1475; 1476; 1477; 1478; 1479; 1480; 1481; 1482; 1483; 1484; 1485; 1486; 1487; 1488; 1489; 1490 …
- Buildings and structures: Art; Archaeology; Architecture; Literature; Music; Philosophy; Science; +...

- 1470s
- 1480s in architecture
- 1490s
Other topics in 1480s:
- Art

== Events ==
- 1482 – Francesco di Giorgio Martini, Trattato di architettura, ingegneria e arte militare ("Treatise of Architecture, Engineering and Military Art") is completed after this date
- 1485 – Leon Battista Alberti, De Re Aedificatoria (written 1443–52) becomes the first printed work on architecture

== Buildings and structures ==
=== Buildings ===
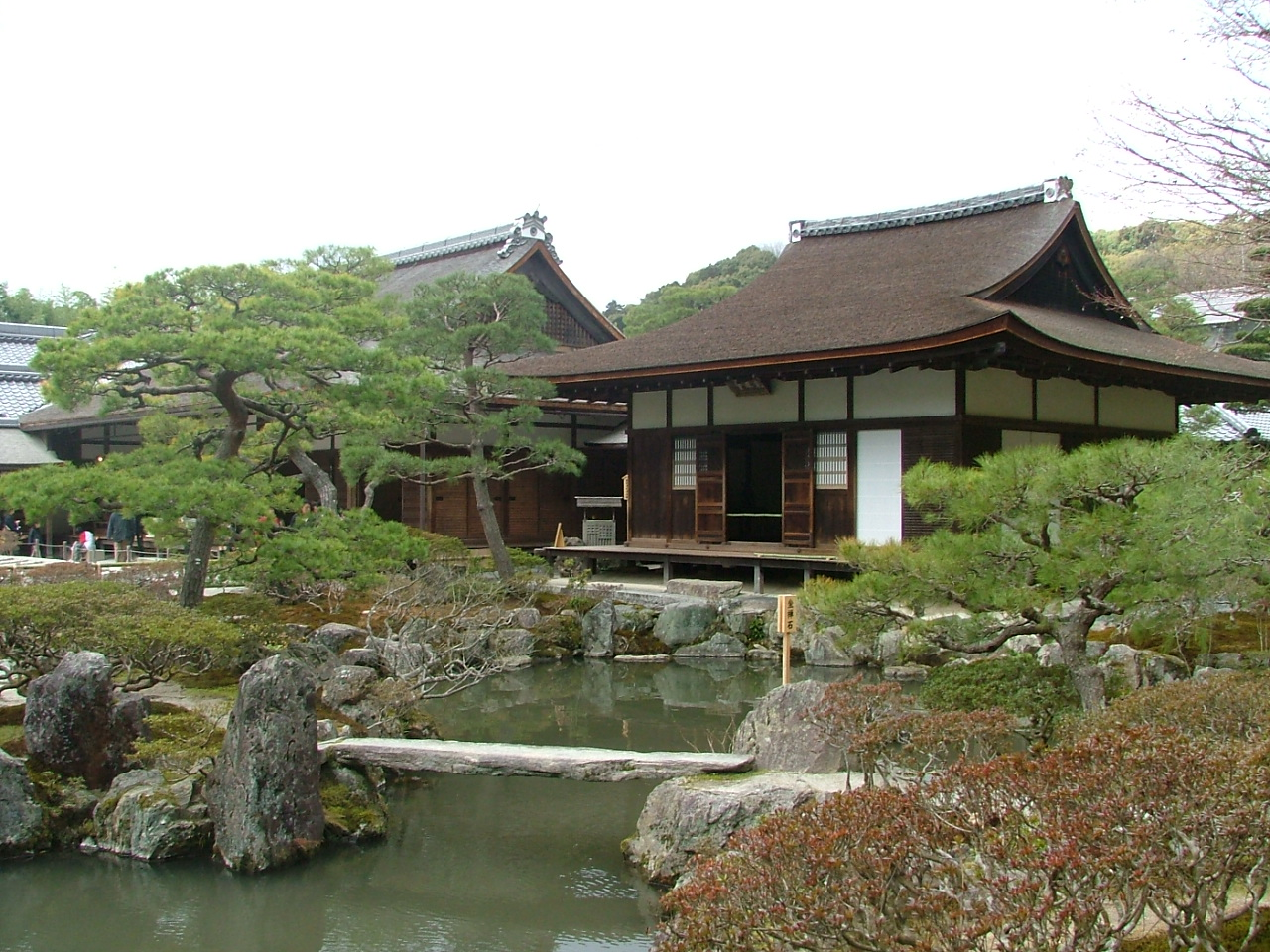
Tōgu-dō (1486) at Ginkaku-ji, Kyoto

- 1480 – Ancienne Douane (Colmar) completed.
- c.1480
  - Great Barn, Hales Hall, Loddon, Norfolk, England, completed.
  - Bayt al-Razzaz palace, Cairo, Egypt, original building completed.
- 1481 – Palazzo Loredan on the Grand Canal (Venice), designed by Mauro Codussi, is begun (completed 1509).
- 1482–1489 – Ginkaku-ji ("Temple of the Silver Pavilion") in Kyoto, Japan, is constructed.
- 1483–1488 – Church of Mariä Krönung (Lautenbach) consecrated and completed.
- 1483 – The Changgyeonggung of Korea is completed.
- 1484–1489 – Koyunbaba Bridge in Anatolia is constructed.
- 1484 – Palazzo Medici in Florence, begun by Michelozzo c.1444/45, is completed.
- 1486 – Rebuilding at Metz Cathedral begins.
- 1487 – Italian architects begin to build the Moscow Kremlin.
- 1489 – Église Saint-Maurice, Soultz-Haut-Rhin completed (started in 1270)

== Births ==
- 1483: April 6 – Raphael, Italian painter and architect (died 1520)
- 1484: April 12 – Antonio da Sangallo the Younger, Italian architect (died 1546)
- 1486: July 2 – Jacopo Sansovino, Italian sculptor and architect (died 1570)
- 1489: April 15 – Mimar Sinan, Ottoman Turkish architect (died 1588)

== Deaths ==
- c. 1481 – Guiniforte Solari, Milanese sculptor, architect and engineer (born c. 1429)
