= 1420s in architecture =

- 1410s
- 1420s in architecture
- 1430s

Architecture timeline

== Buildings and structures ==
=== Buildings ===
- 1417–1420 – Ulugh Beg Madrasah in Samarkand is built.
- 1419–1427 – Ospedale degli Innocenti in Florence (first stage), designed by Filippo Brunelleschi.
- 1420
  - Khan Jaqmaq, Damascus, is completed.
  - Forbidden City of Beijing, China, is completed.
  - Temple of Heaven in Beijing is completed.

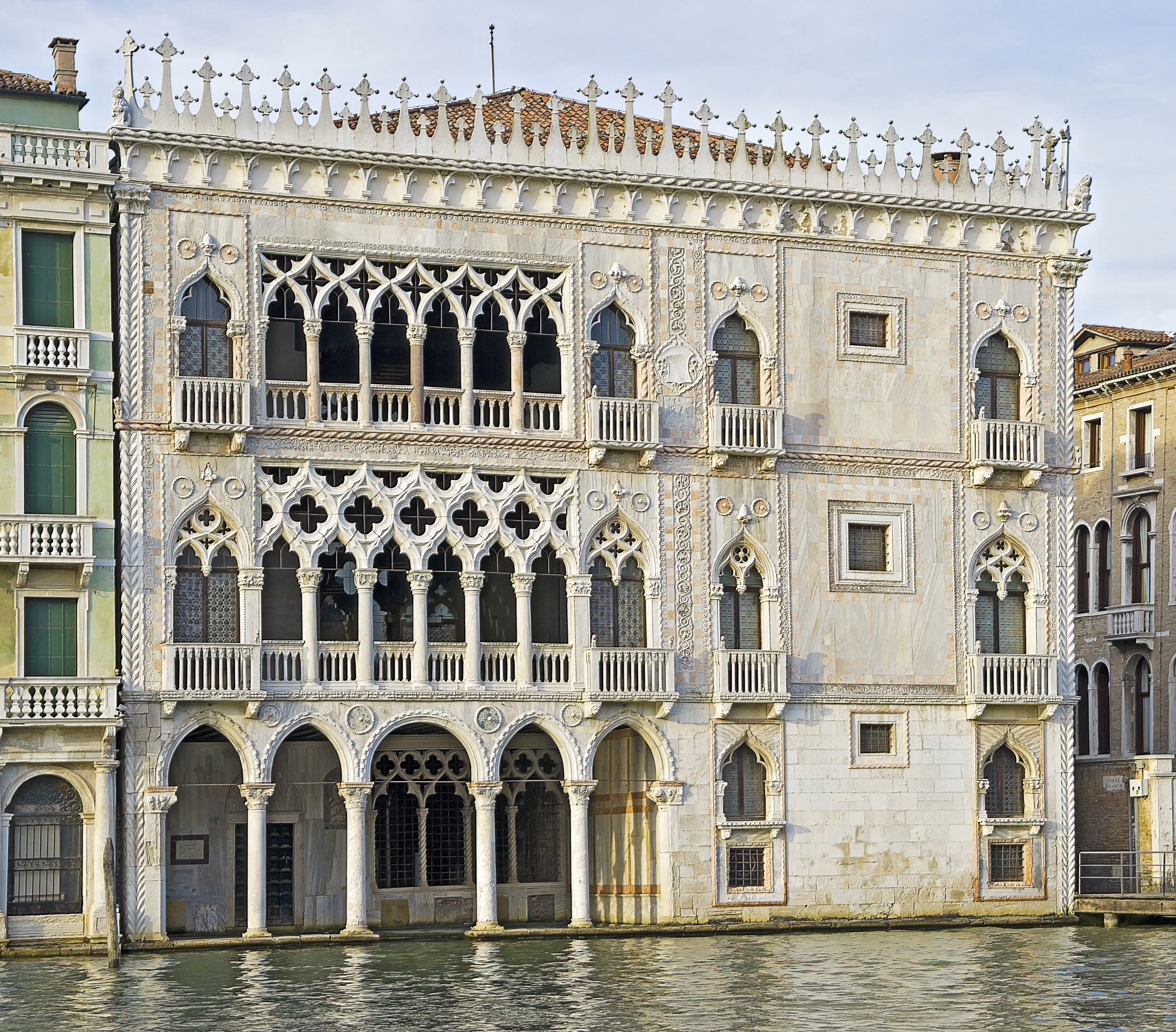
Ca' d'Oro, Venice

- 1421 – Traditional foundation date of Larabanga Mosque in northern Ghana.
- 1424 – Start of final stage of construction of Doge's Palace, Venice.
- 1425 – Rebuilding of Sherborne Abbey choir, England, begins.
- c. 1425 – Rebuilding of St. Leonhard, Frankfurt, choir, perhaps by Madern Gerthener.
- 1428–1430 – Ca' d'Oro, Venice, built by Giovanni and his son Bartolomeo Bon for the Contarini family of doges.
- 1427 – Harmondsworth Great Barn in England is completed.
- 1428 – Church of Sant'Agostino, Amatrice, Kingdom of Naples, is built.
- 1429 – Ulugh Beg Observatory in Samarkand is completed.

== Births ==
- c. 1429 – Guiniforte Solari, Milanese engineer, architect and sculptor (died 1481)
