= 18th century BC in architecture =

== Buildings and structures ==
=== Buildings ===
- 1720s BC – Knossos rebuilt
- Karnak Temple begun
- Royal Palace of Mari is built
