= 1520s in architecture =

- 1510s
- 1520s in architecture
- 1530s

Architecture timeline

== Buildings and structures ==
=== Buildings ===
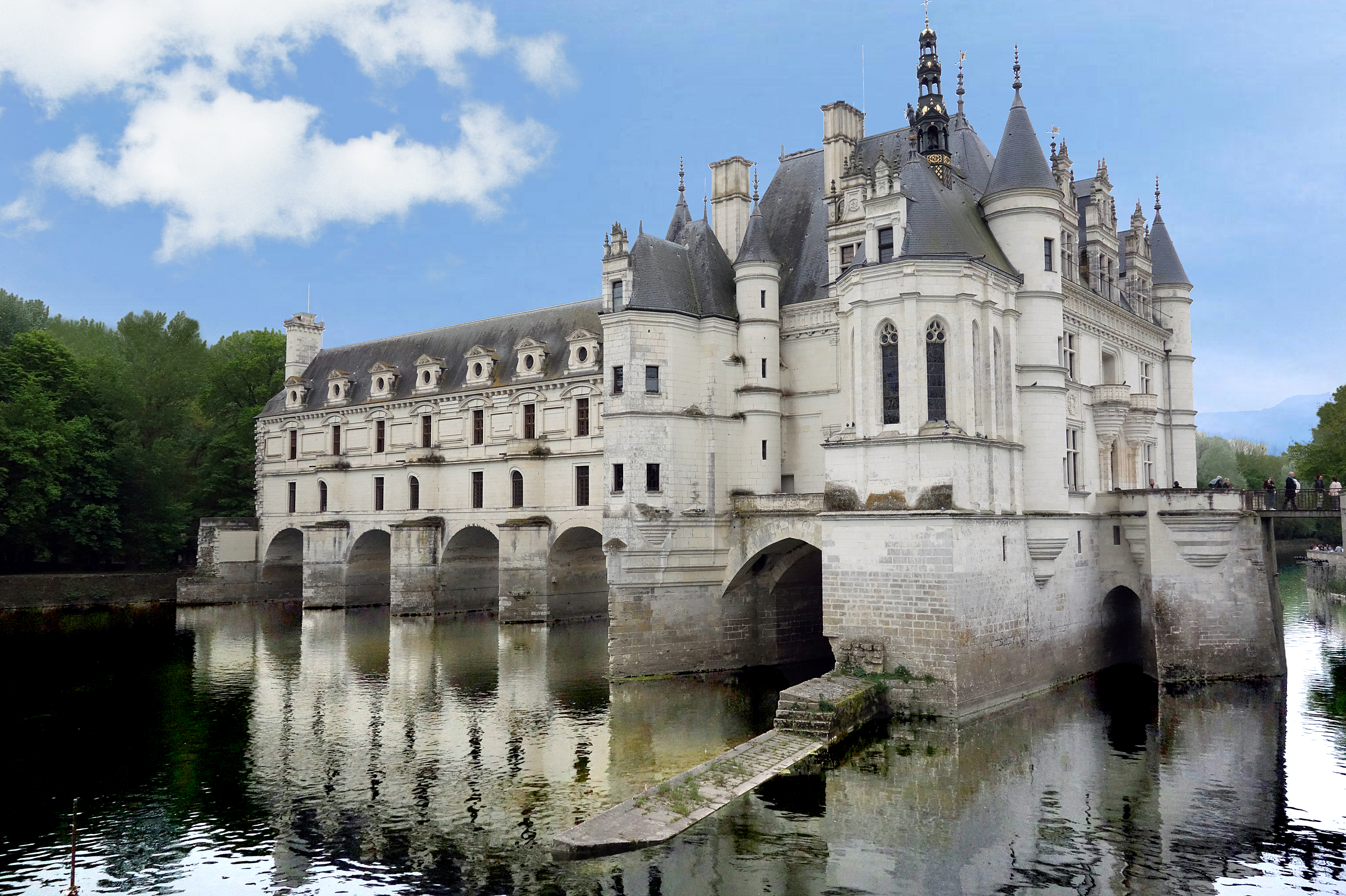
Château de Chenonceau in the French Loire Valley

- c. 1520
  - Lupton's Range (third side of the Eton School Yard), with Lupton's Tower, designed by architect Henry Redman, completed at Eton College in England.
  - Metz Cathedral in the Duchy of Lorraine completed by construction of south transept.
  - Rebuilding of San Giacomo Scossacavalli in Rome begun by Antonio da Sangallo the Younger (completed 1592).
- 1521
  - Château de Chenonceau built in the French Loire Valley.
  - Rebuilding of Hampton Court Palace near London completed by Cardinal Wolsey.
- 1522 – Vilnius City wall completed, including the Gate of Dawn.
- 1523 – Completion of Saint-Jacques Tower, Paris.
- 1525
  - Laurentian Library in Florence designed by Michelangelo.
  - Rebuilding of St Peter and St Paul's Church, Lavenham, England, probably to the design of John Wastell (died 1515), completed.
  - Rebuilding of Segovia Cathedral begun by Juan Gil de Hontañón.
  - Palazzo del Te, Mantua, begun by Giulio Romano.

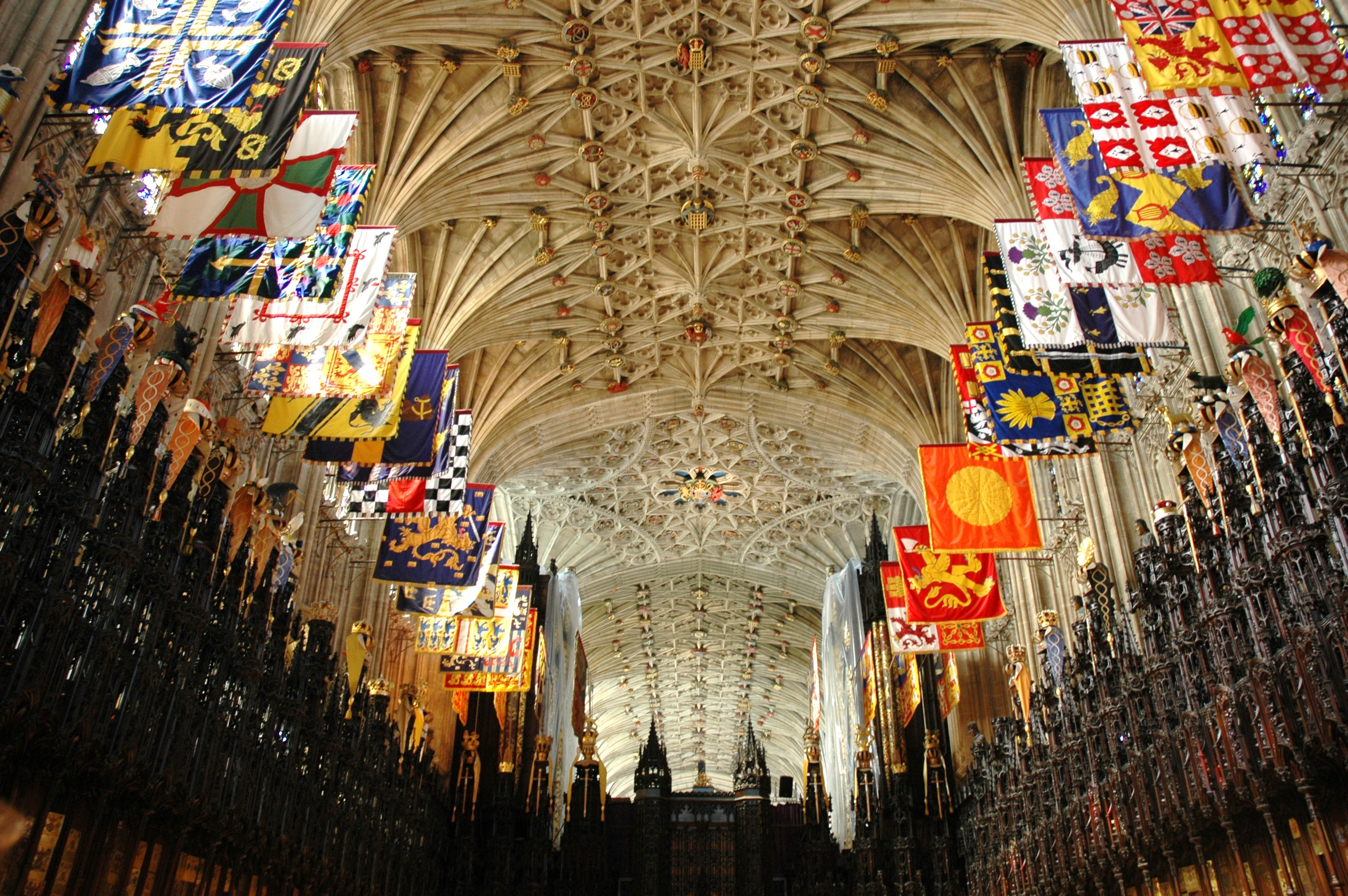
St. George's Chapel, Windsor Castle

- 1527 – Kabuli Bagh Mosque in Panipat, Mughal Empire, built.
- 1528
  - St. George's Chapel, Windsor Castle, England completed.
  - Zhaosi Hall, Wuxi, China completed.

== Events ==
- Jacopo Sansovino is appointed chief architect and superintendent of properties (Protomaestro or Proto) to the Procurators of San Marco in Venice.

== Births ==
- c.1520 – Girolamo Cassar, Maltese architect and engineer (d. c. 1589–92)
- 1521: April 5 – Francesco Laparelli, Italian architect and engineer (d. 1570)
- 1527 – Hans Vredeman de Vries, Dutch architect and engineer (d. c. 1607)

== Deaths ==
- 1520: April 6 – Raphael, Italian painter and architect (b. 1483)
