= Conrad Pflüger =

Conrad or Konrad Pflüger (c. 1450 in Swabia – probably 1506 or 1507 in Leipzig) was one of the leading architects and master builders of the late Gothic period in Germany. In the 1490s he was the highest artistic authority in Albertine Saxony. He was also city architect to Görlitz, 'Werkmeister' (chief of works) to the Dukes of Saxony and designer of All Saints' Church, Wittenberg.
