= 1070s in architecture =

- 1060s
- 1070s in architecture
- 1080s
Other topics in 1070s:
- Art

== Buildings and structures ==
=== Buildings ===
- 1070 – Nidaros Cathedral in Trondheim, Norway, begun.
- 1070 – Rebuilding of Canterbury Cathedral in England following a fire.
- 1070 – Rebuilding of York Minster in England begins.
- 1070 – Construction of Dudley Castle in England by Ansculf de Picquigny begins.
- 1070 – Construction of Richmond Castle in Yorkshire, England begins.
- 1072 – Construction of Lincoln Cathedral in England begins.
- 1075 – Würzburg Cathedral reconstruction completed (begun in 1045).
- 1075 – Santiago de Compostela Cathedral in Galicia (Spain) begun. Tympanum dated 1078.
- 1077 – Abbey of Saint-Étienne, Caen, Normandy consecrated.
- 1077 – Current Bayeux Cathedral, Normandy consecrated.
- 1077 – Construction of St Albans Cathedral begins in England.
- 1077 – Panchkuta Basadi, originally known as Urdhvitilaka (glory of the world), one of the Humcha Jain temples in India, built in the style of Badami Chalukya architecture.
- 1078 – Construction of Colchester Castle begins in England under the direction of Bishop Gundulf of Rochester.
- 1078 (approx.) – White Tower (Tower of London) begun under the direction of Bishop Gundulf of Rochester.
- 1079 – Rebuilding of Winchester Cathedral begun.
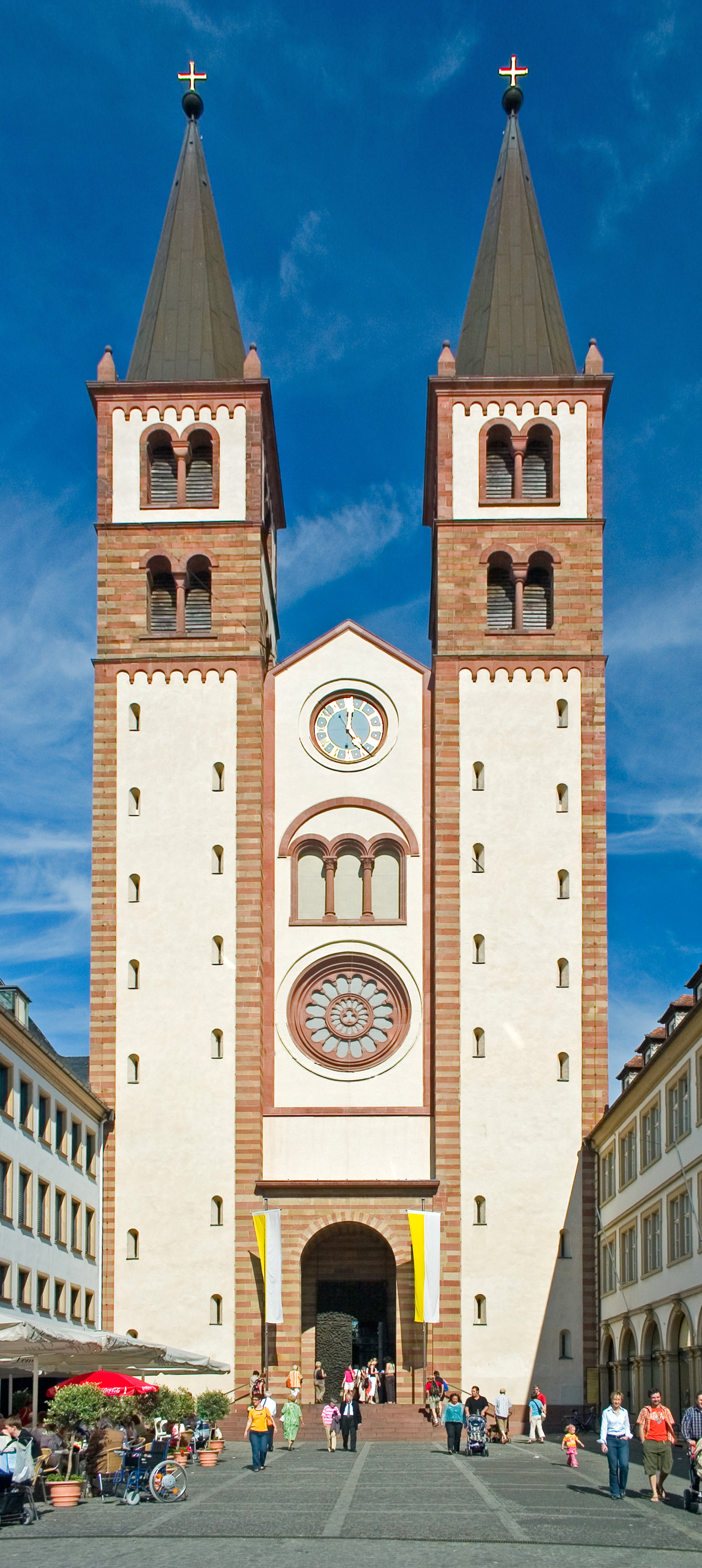
Würzburg Cathedral (1075)

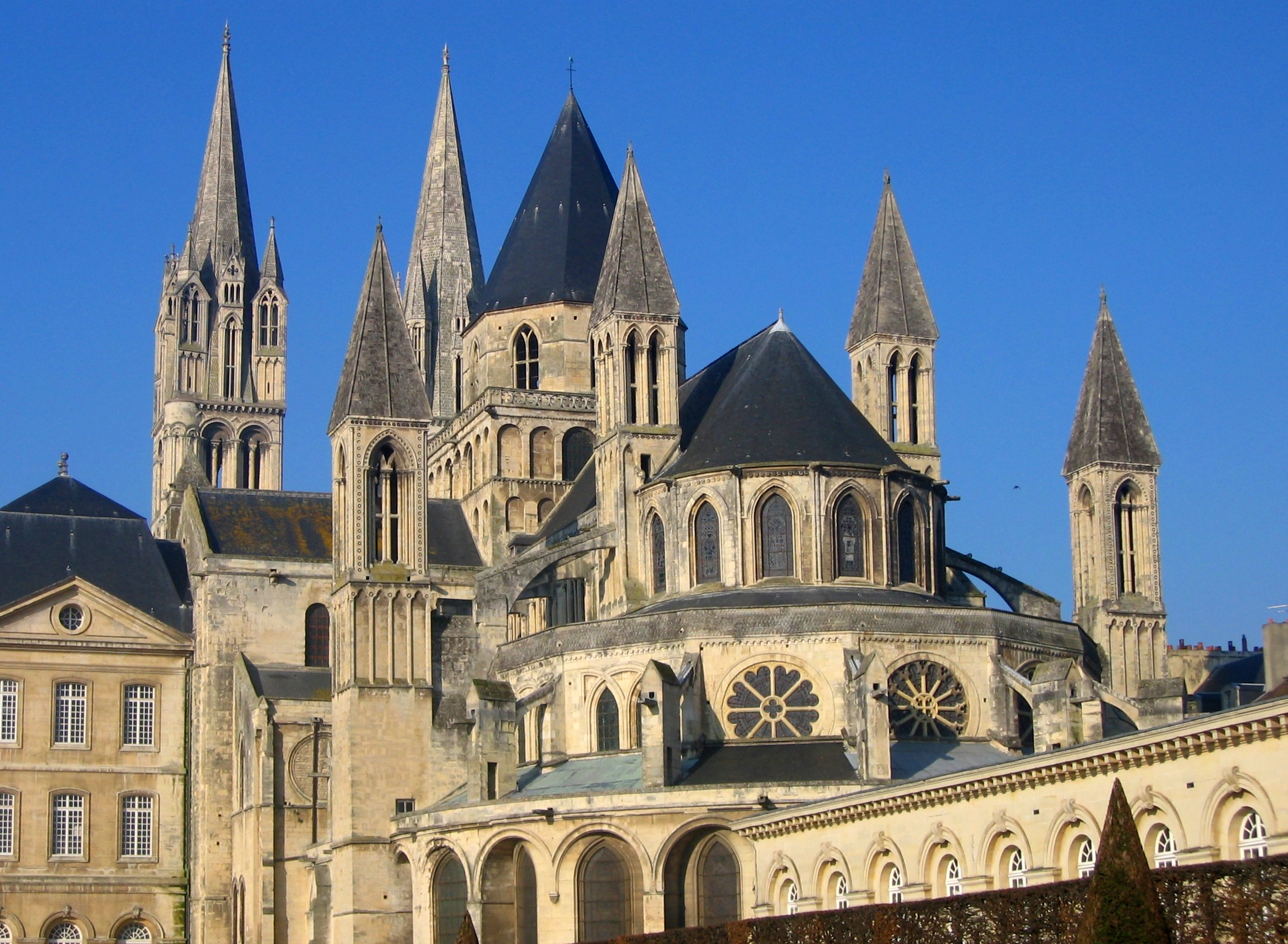
Abbey of St-Étienne, Caen (1077)

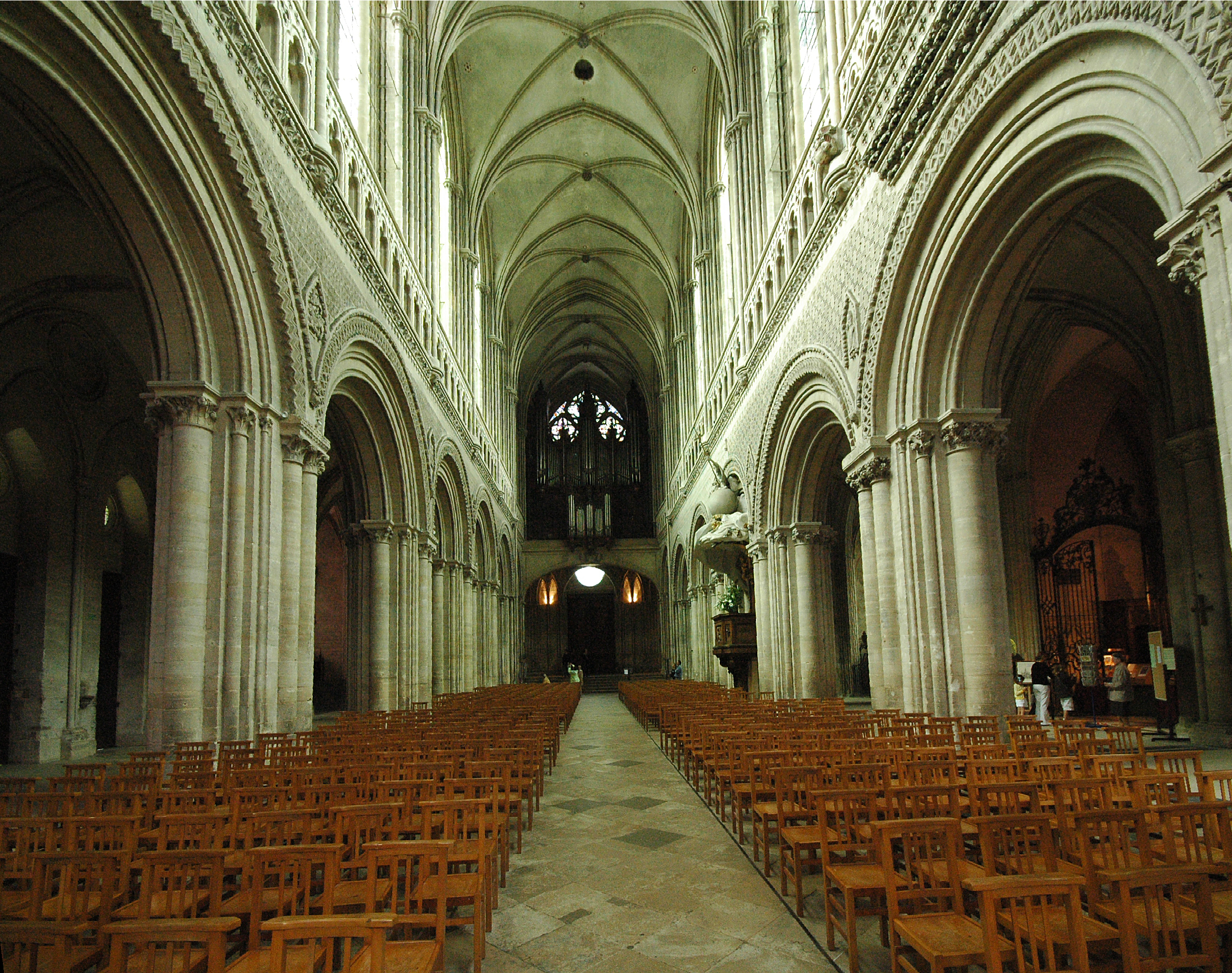
Bayeux Cathedral (1077)

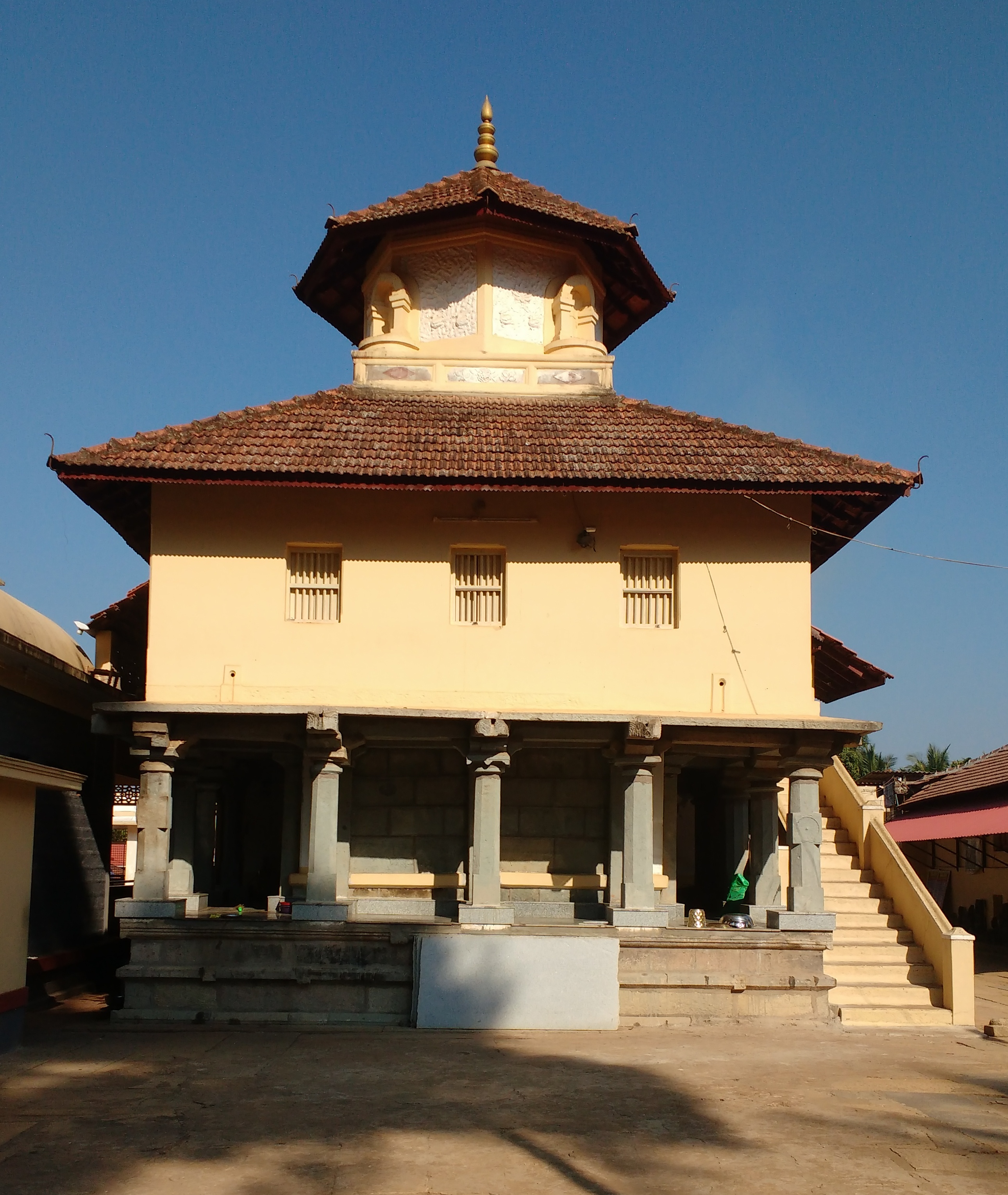
Panchkuta Basadi (1077)
