= 1000s in architecture =

- 1000s in architecture
- 1010s

Architecture timeline

== Buildings and structures ==
=== Buildings ===
- 1000 – The Chiesa di San Giuliano (Church of San Guliano) is built Ascoli Piceno, Italy.
- 1000 – Matangeshwar, Vishnu-Garuda, Beejamandal and Ganesha temples are built in Khajuraho, Chandela kingdom.
- 1001 – The Cathedral of Ani is built in Armenia.
- 1001 – St. Michael's Church, Hildesheim begun.
- 1002 – Brihadishwara Temple of Thanjavur, India (Chola Empire) begun.
- 1003 – The Bagrati Cathedral's floor is laid in Kutaisi, Georgia.
- 1004 – The Chiesa di San Giovanale is built in Orvieto, Italy.
- 1008 – Rebuilt Torcello Cathedral in the Veneto consecrated.
- 1009 – Abbey of Saint-Martin-du-Canigou in Casteil, Catalonia consecrated.
- Beginning of 11th century – Church of the Saviour at Berestove built.
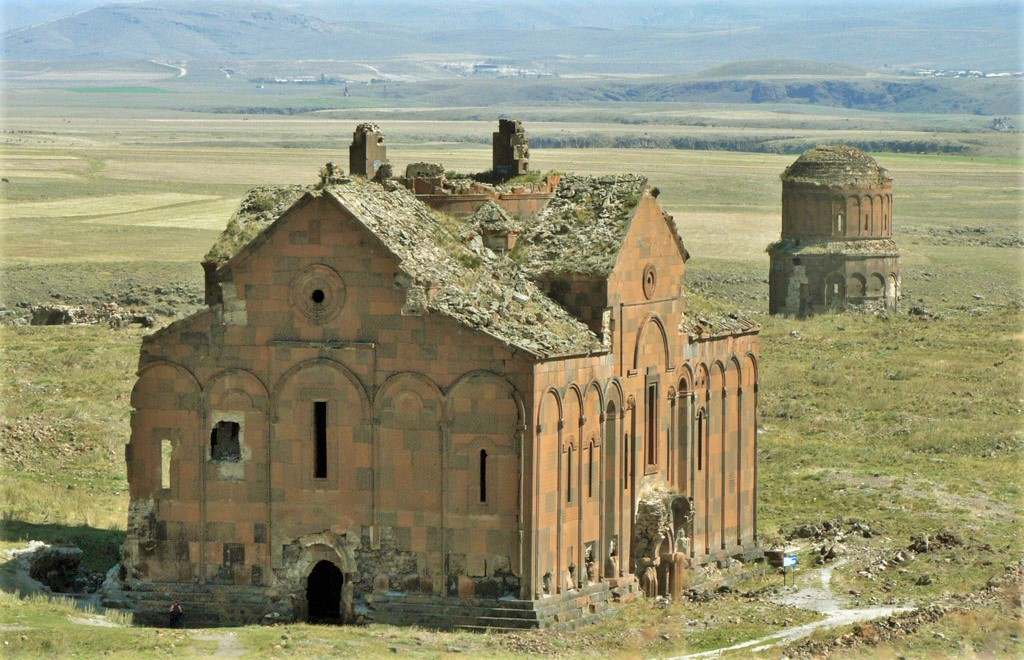
Cathedral of Ani (1001)

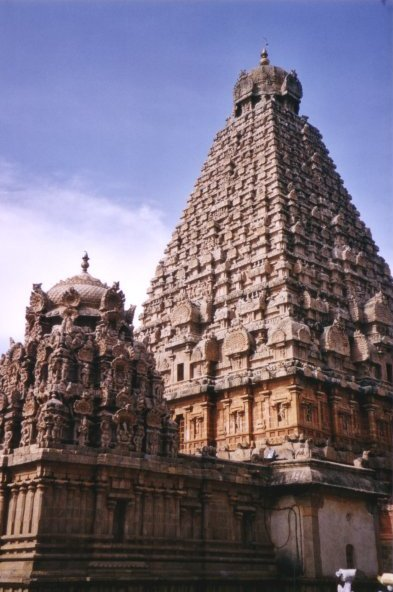
Brihadishwara Temple, Thanjavur (1002)

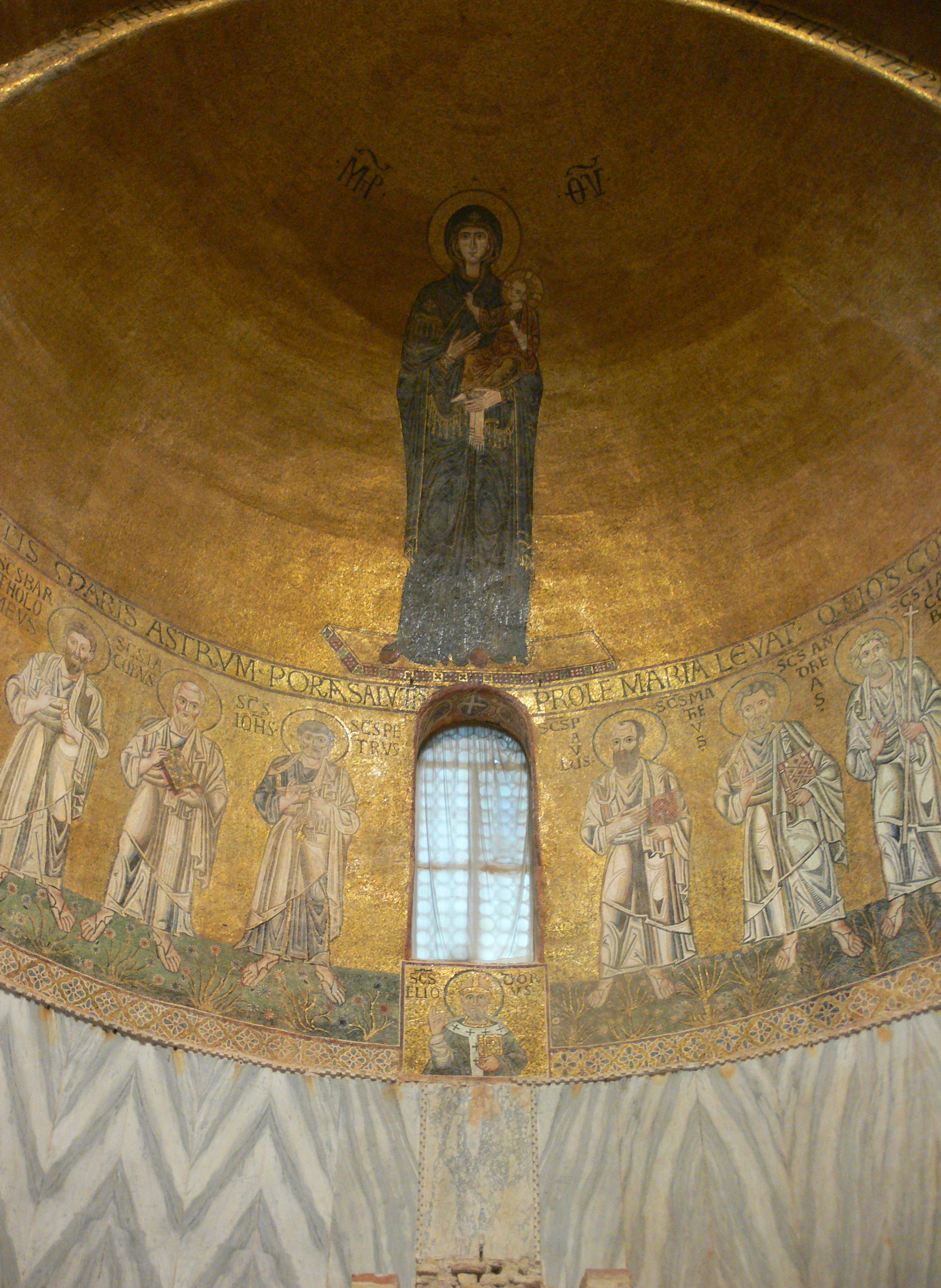
Torcello Cathedral (1008)

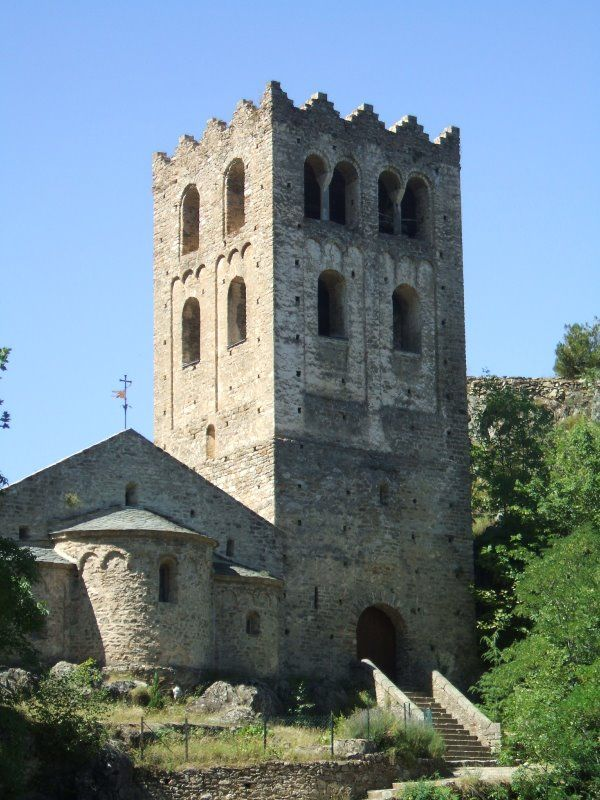
Saint-Martin-du-Canigou (1009)
