= 1080s in architecture =

- 1070s
- 1080s in architecture
- 1090s

Architecture timeline

== Buildings and structures ==
=== Buildings ===
- 1080
  - Rebuilding of Basilica of St. Sernin, Toulouse begun.
  - Construction of Cluny Abbey III in France, begun.
- Circa 1080
  - The first building of what would become the Château de Picomtal was built.
- 1081
  - Surviving Chora Church in Constantinople completed (begun in 1077).
  - Aljafería Palace in Zaragoza, Spain completed (begun in 1065).
  - Old Mainz Cathedral destroyed by a fire, marking the beginning of the construction of the building which survives to the modern day.
- 1082 – Great Mosque of Tlemcen built in the Almoravid Empire.
- 1083 – Surviving Ely Cathedral in England begun.
- 1086 – Shwezigon Pagoda in Nyaung-U completed.
- before 1087 – Construction of the Church of Christ Pantepoptes in Constantinople begun.
- 1087
  - White Tower (Tower of London) in England finished (begun in 1078).
  - Basilica di San Nicola in Bari, Apulia, begun.
- 1088
  - Rebuilding of Cluny Abbey in France begun.
  - Eynsford Castle in England built.
- 1089 – Romanesque stage of St Albans Cathedral in England completed.
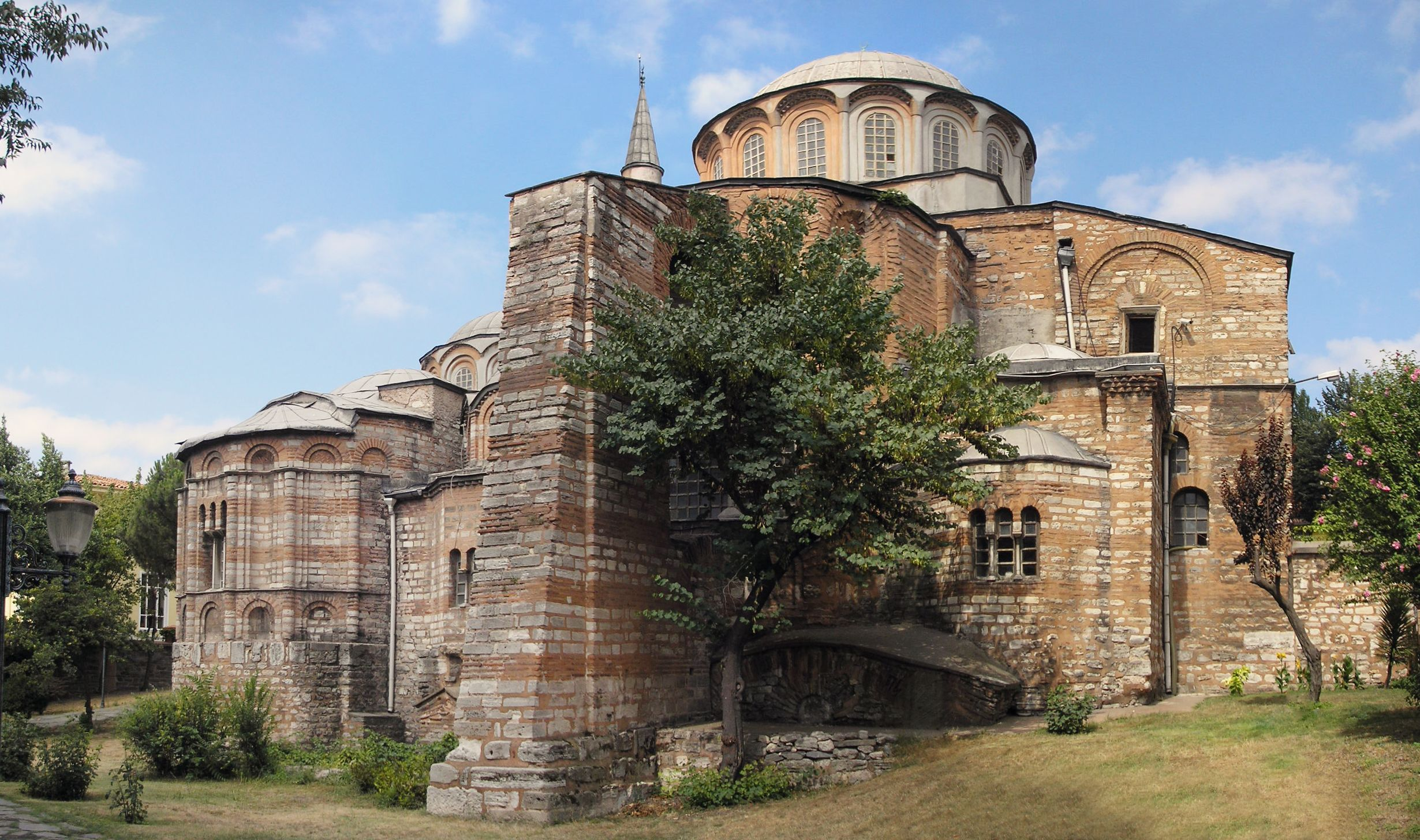
Chora Church (1081)

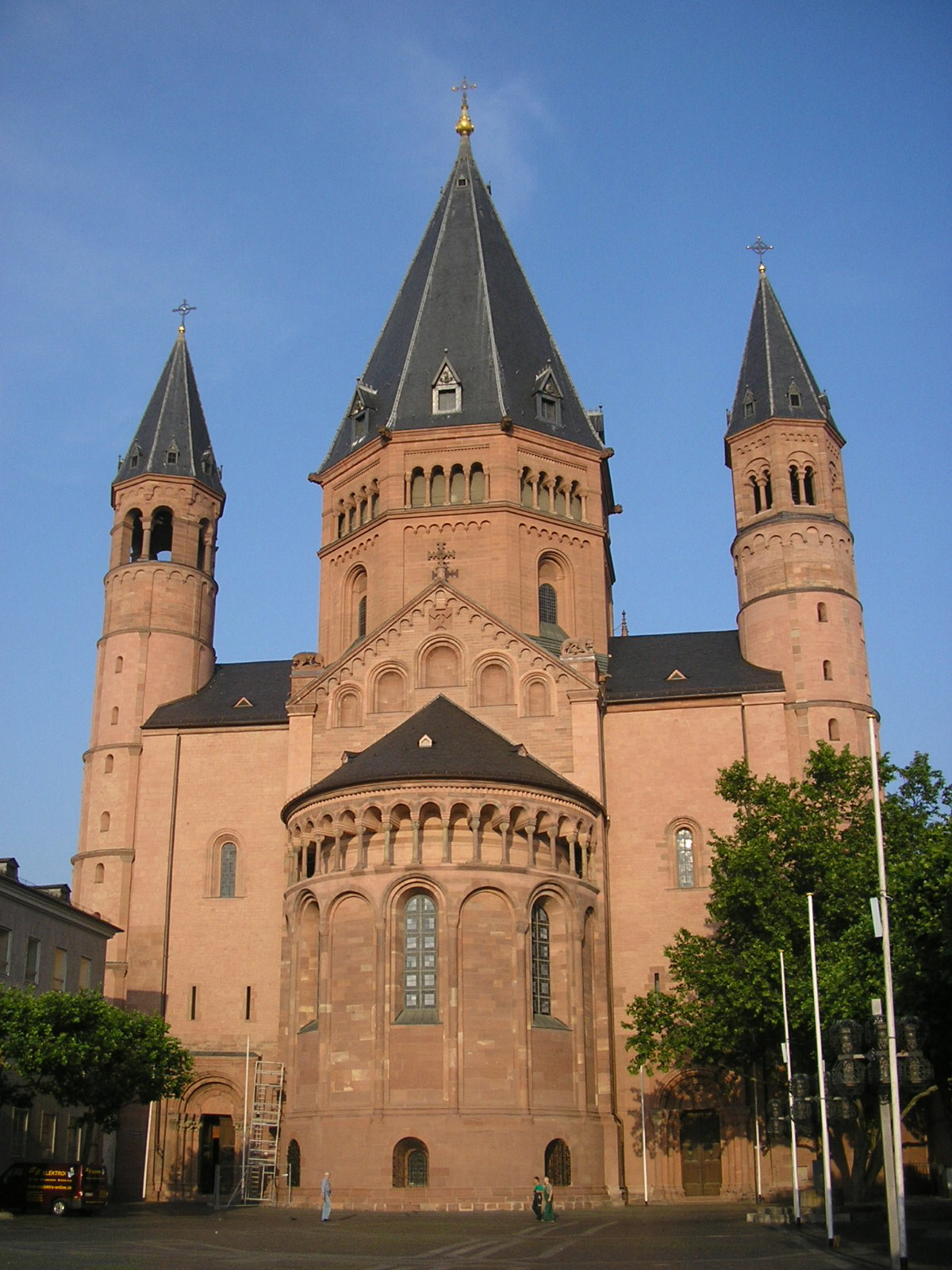
Romanesque Mainz Cathedral (begun 1081)

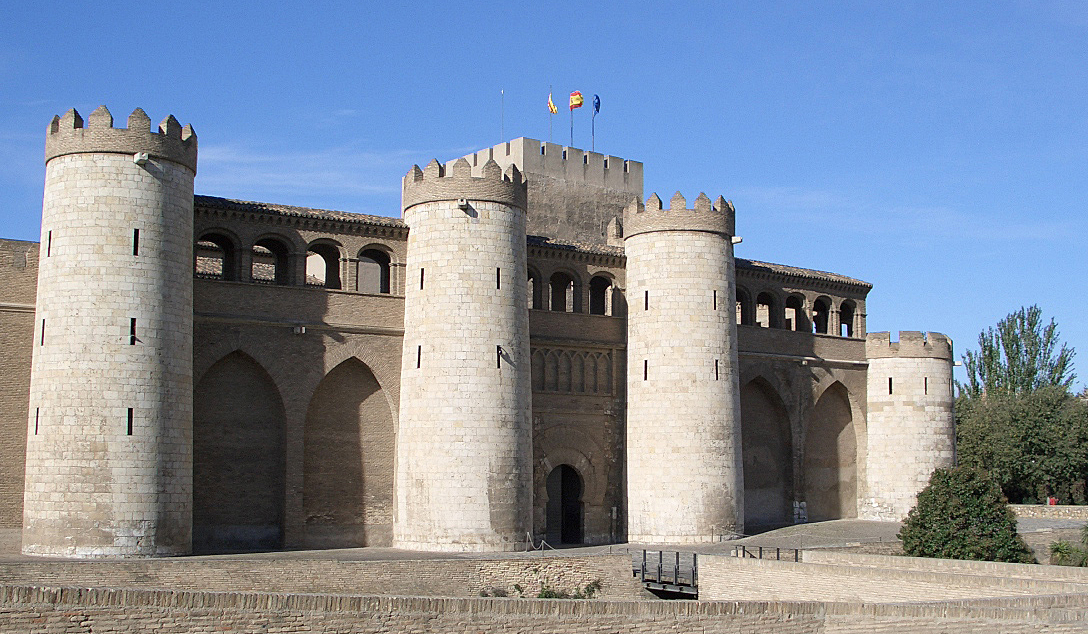
Aljaferia Palace of Zaragoza (1081)

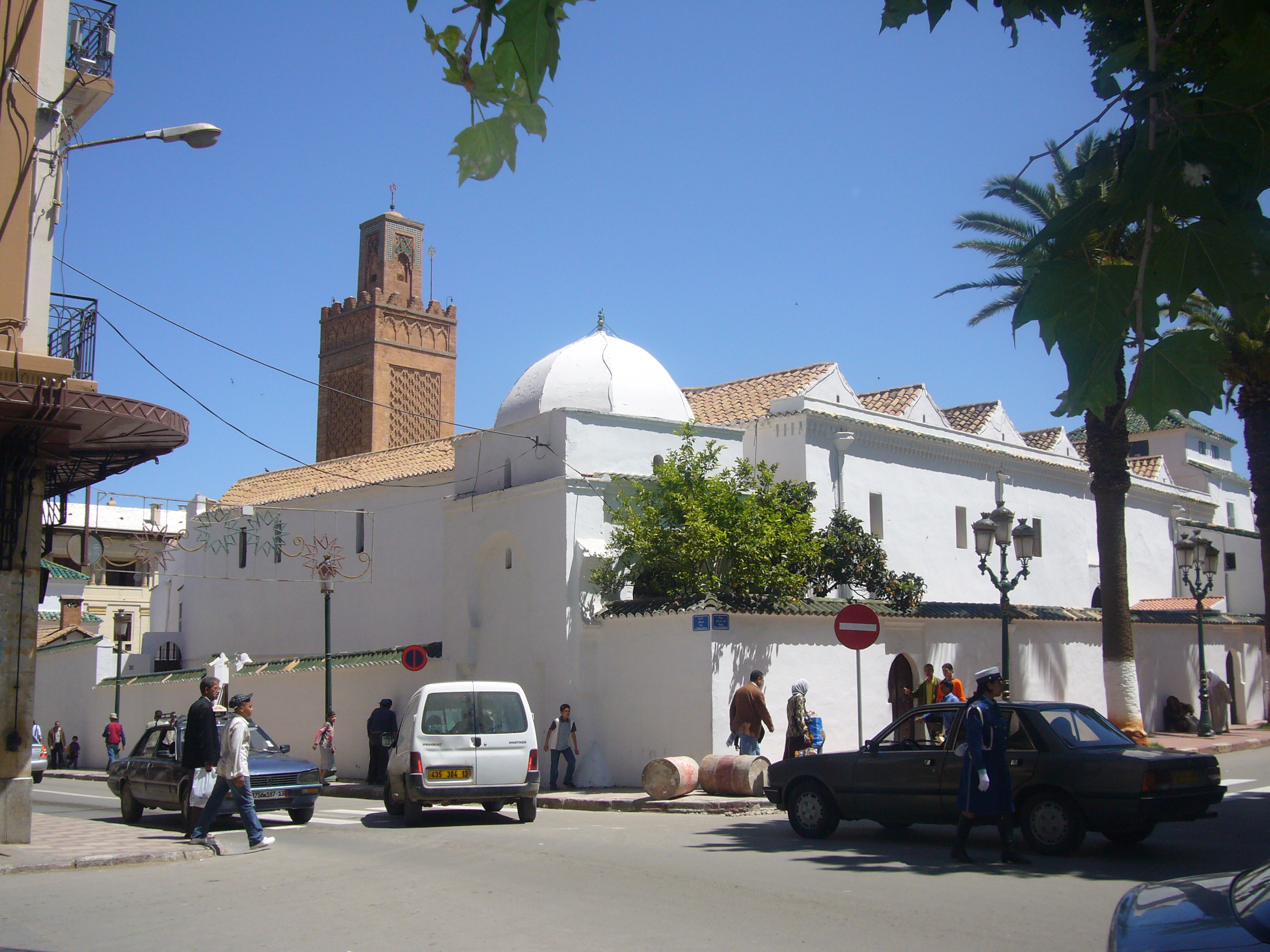
Great Mosque of Tlemcen (1082)

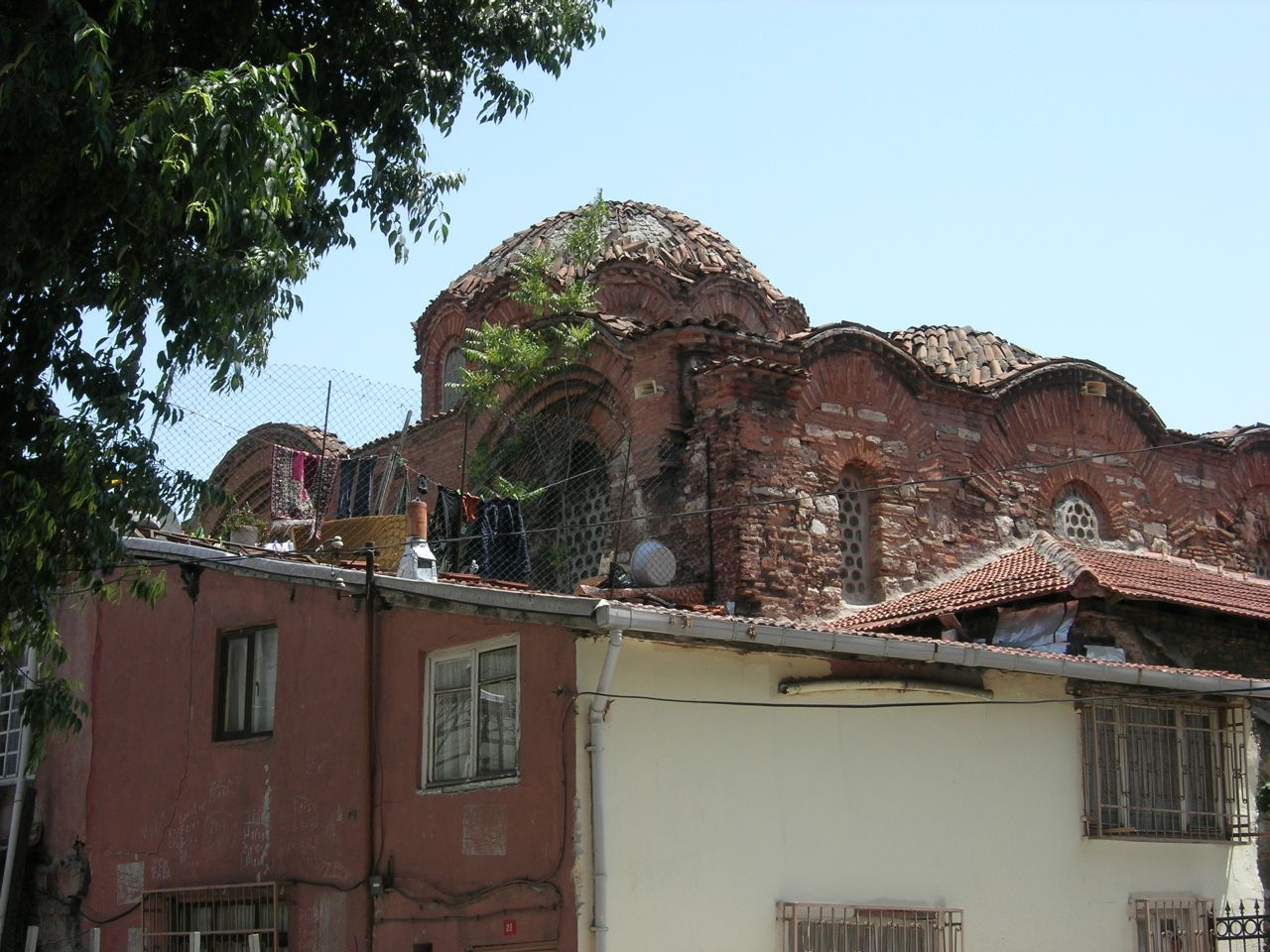
Church of Christ Pantepoptes (begun before 1087)

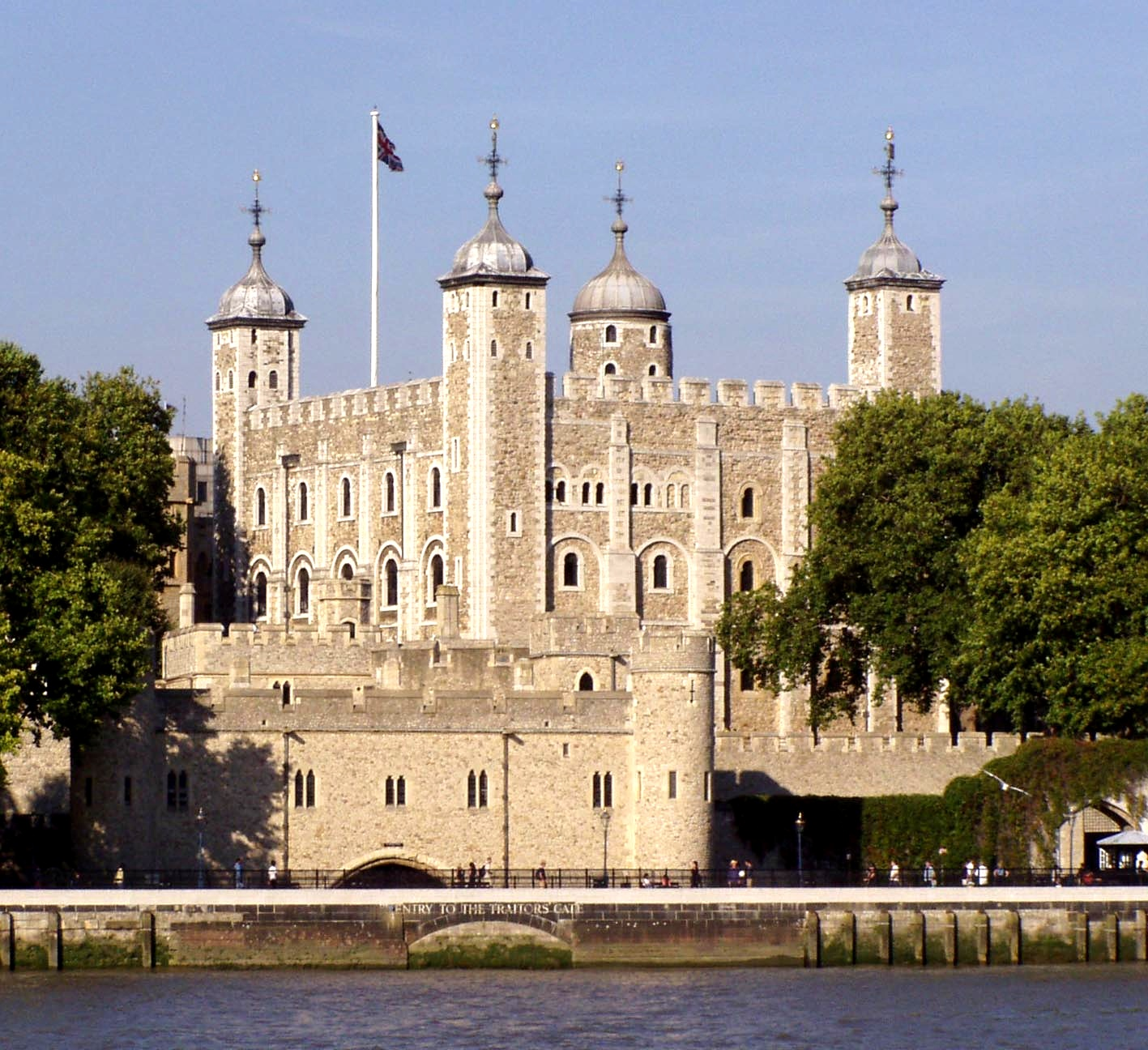
White Tower of London (1087)

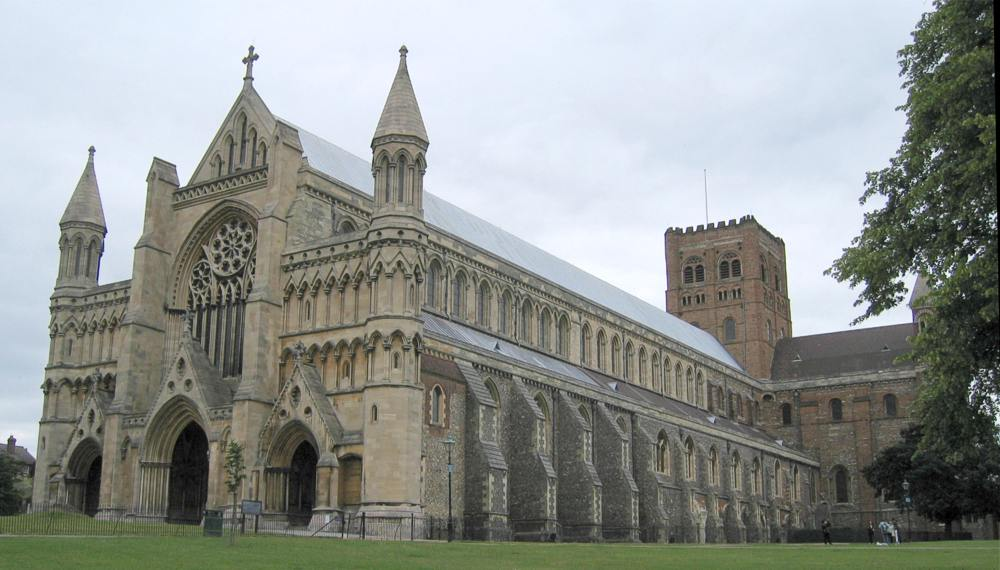
St Albans Cathedral (1089)

== Births ==
- c. 1081 – Abbot Suger (died 1151), French abbot-statesman and patron of Gothic architecture.
