= 1020s in architecture =

- 1010s
- 1020s in architecture
- 1030s
Other topics in 1020s:
- Art

== Buildings and structures ==
=== Buildings ===
- 1021 – Church of the Quedlinburg Abbey, Holy Roman Empire built (begun c. 997).
- 1022 – Monastery of Sant Pere de Rodes, Catalonia consecrated.
- 1023 – Jagadambi and Chitragupta temples are built in Khajuraho, Chandela kingdom.
- About 1023
  - Romanesque church at Mont Saint-Michel off the Normandy coast founded.
  - Construction of Church of St Philibert, Tournus in Burgundy begun.
- About 1025 – City of Gangaikonda Cholapuram founded as a capital of the Chola Empire.
- 1026 – Pomposa Abbey near Ferrara, Italy completed (except the campanile finished in 1063).
- 1027 – Adinath Temple and Shantinatha temple are built in Khajuraho, Chandela kingdom.
- 1029 – Kandariya Mahadeva is built in Khajuraho, Chandela kingdom.
- 1029 – Construction of Sant Vicenç de Cardonia, Catalonia begun.
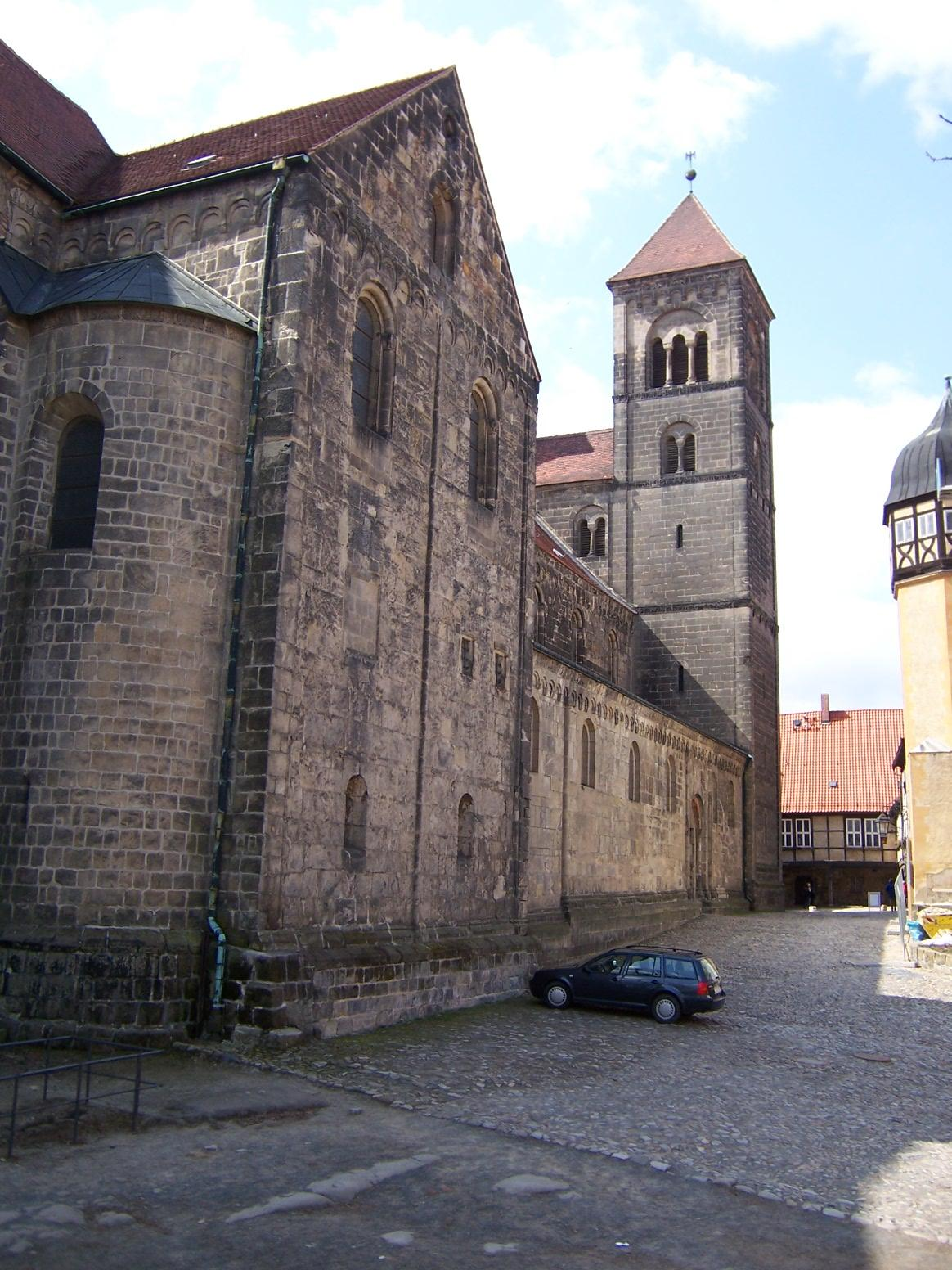
Quedlinburg Abbey (1021)

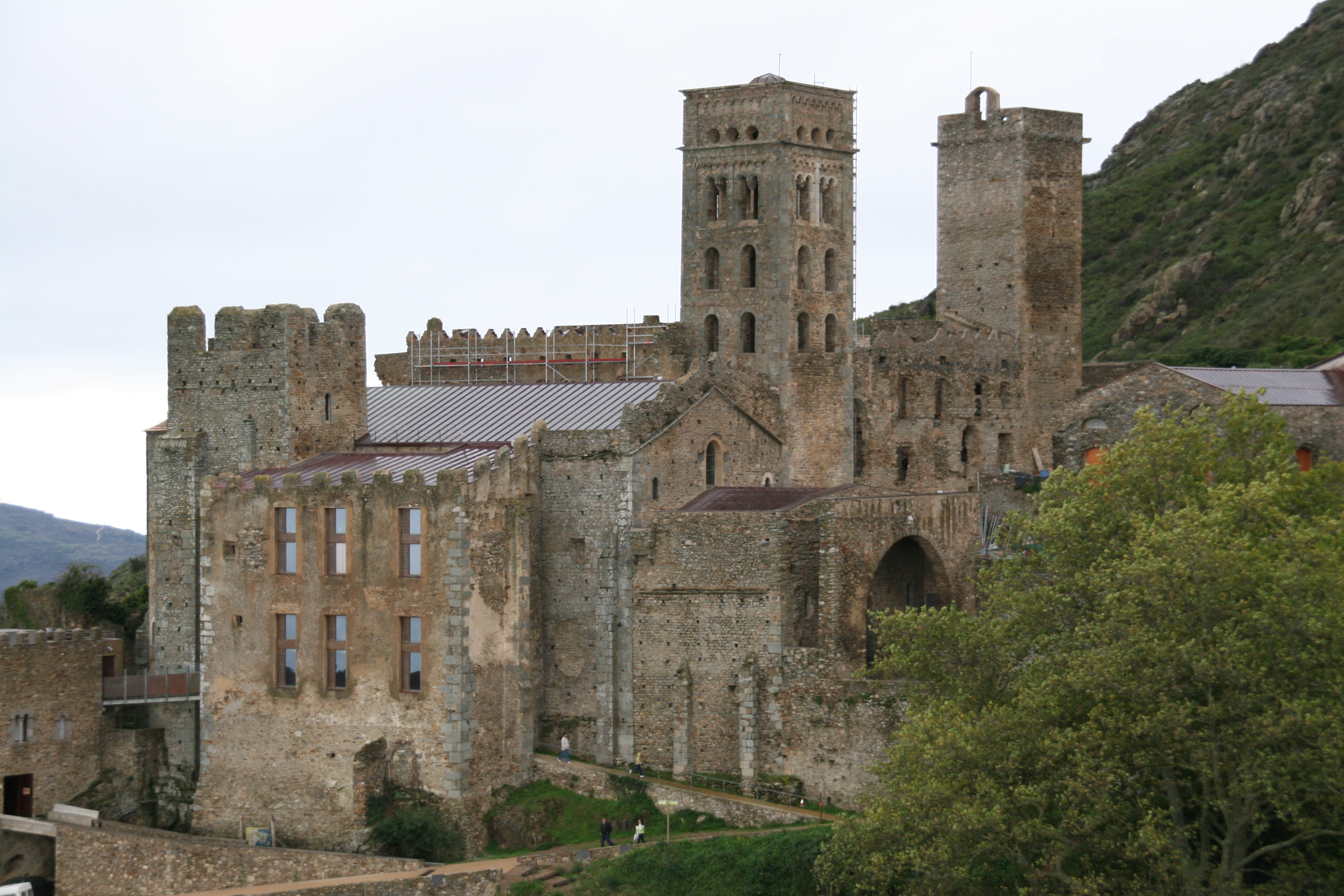
Monastery of Sant Pere de Rodes (1022)

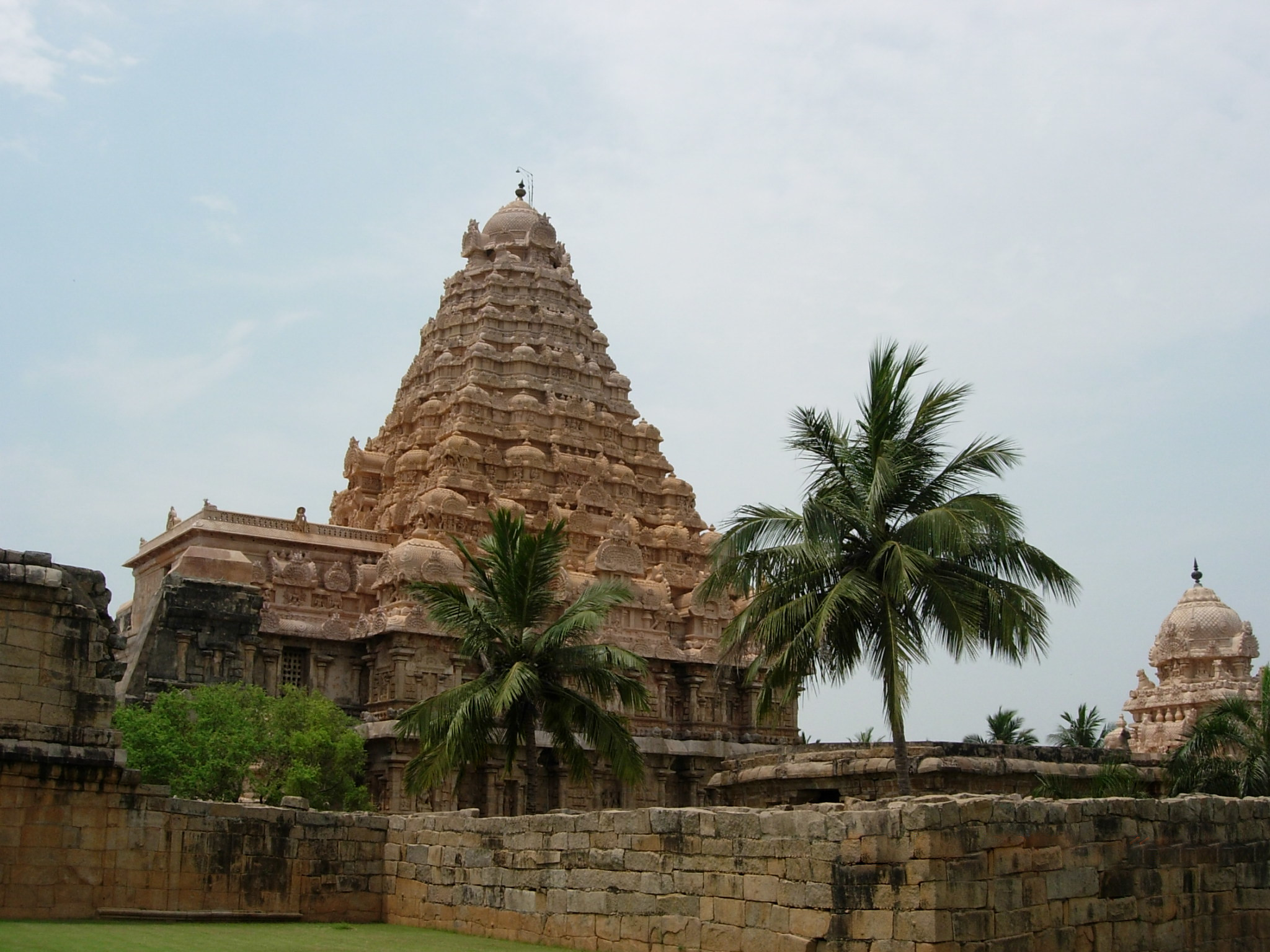
Temple in Gangaikonda Cholapuram (1025)

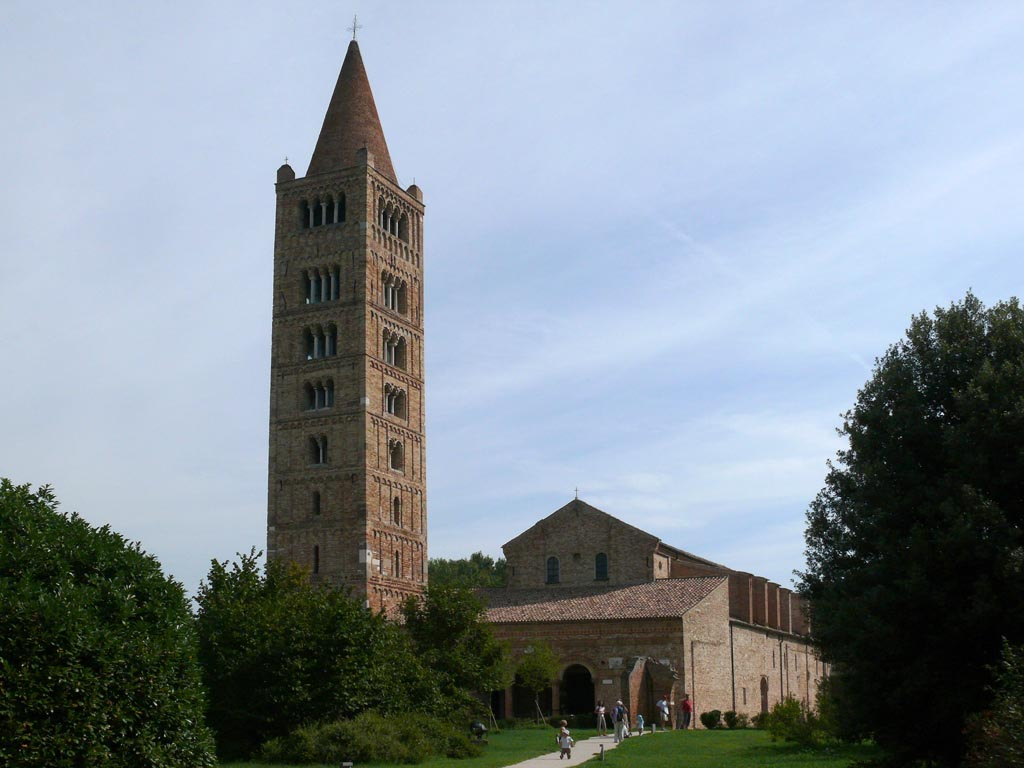
Pomposa Abbey (1026)
