= 1030s in architecture =

- 1020s
- 1030s in architecture
- 1040s
Other topics in 1030s:
- Art

== Buildings and structures ==
=== Buildings ===
- 1030 – Speyer Cathedral, Germany, initiated by Emperor Konrad II.
- 1032 – Santa Maria de Ripoll, Catalonia is consecrated.
- 1033 – St. Michael's Church, Hildesheim, Holy Roman Empire, completed and consecrated.
- 1034 – The Saviour Cathedral of Chernihiv
- 1036 – Al-Aqsa Mosque in Jerusalem restored and renovated by the Fatimid caliph after an earthquake in 1033.
- 1037 – Chartres Cathedral in France consecrated for the fifth time (building destroyed today).
- 1037 – St Sophia Cathedral in Kiev founded.
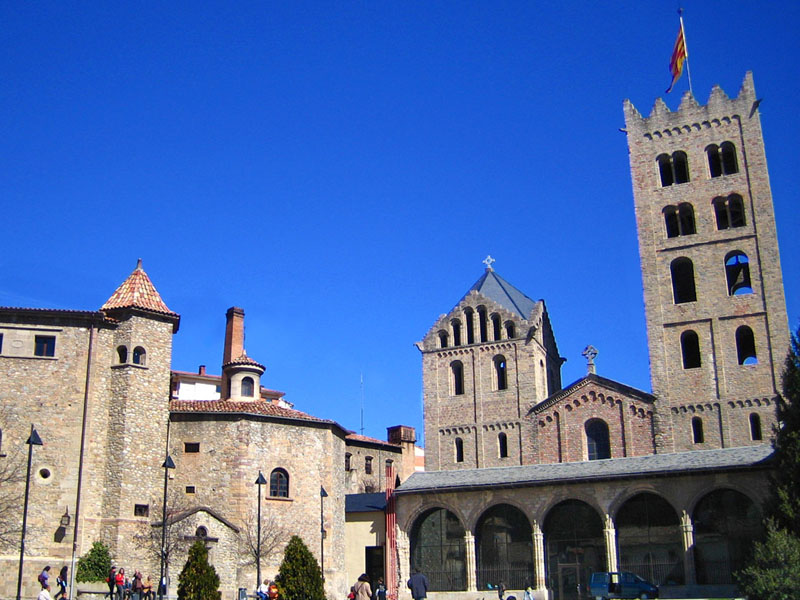
Santa Maria de Ripoll (1032)

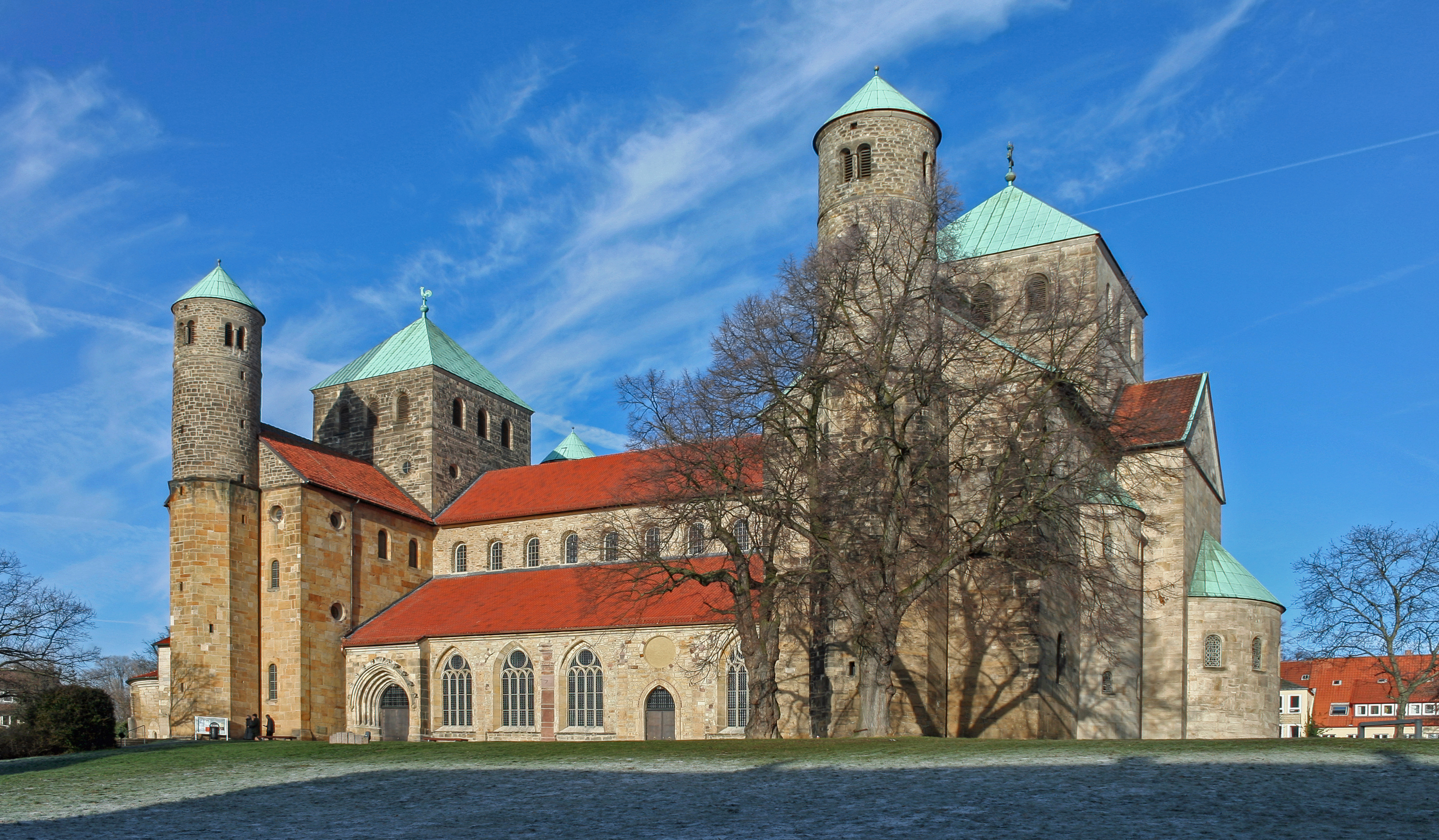
St. Michael's Church, Hildesheim (1033)
