= 1010s in architecture =

- 1000s
- 1010s in architecture
- 1020s

Architecture timeline

== Buildings and structures ==
=== Buildings ===
- 1010
  - Svetitskhoveli Cathedral in Mtskheta, Georgia commissioned. Building finished in 1929.
  - Brihadeeswarar Temple in Thanjavur, southern India, completed.
- 1011
  - San Vittore alle Chiuse in Genga, Papal States built.
  - Imperial Citadel of Thăng Long in Hanoi, Đại Việt begun.
- c. 1012 – Katholikon of Hosios Loukas built in Byzantine Greece.
- 1013
  - Al-Hakim Mosque in Cairo, Fatimid Empire built (begun in 990).
  - San Miniato al Monte begun in Florence, Italy (work continues until the 13th century).
- 1016
  - San Michele in Borgo in Pisa, Italy built.
  - Cluniac Abbey Church of Saint-Bénigne, Dijon, Burgundy consecrated.
- c. 1017 – Hōjōji (法成寺) built in Heian-kyō, Japan.
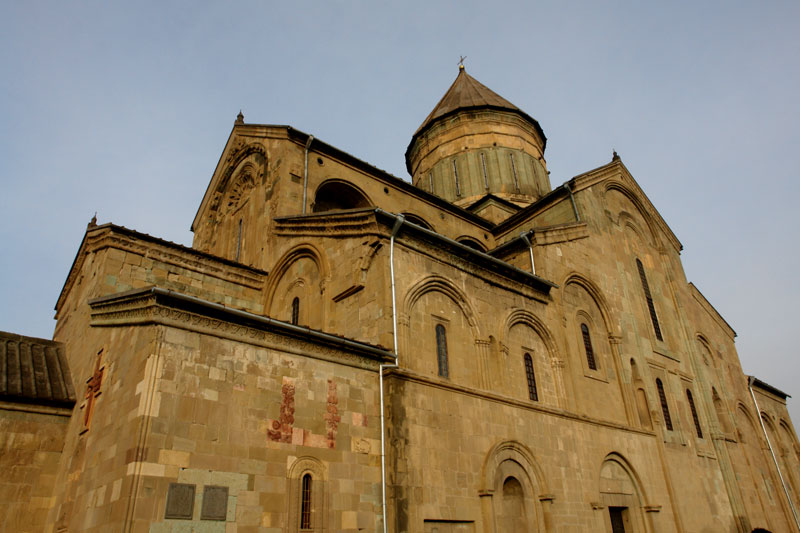
Svetitskhoveli Cathedral, Mtskheta (1010)

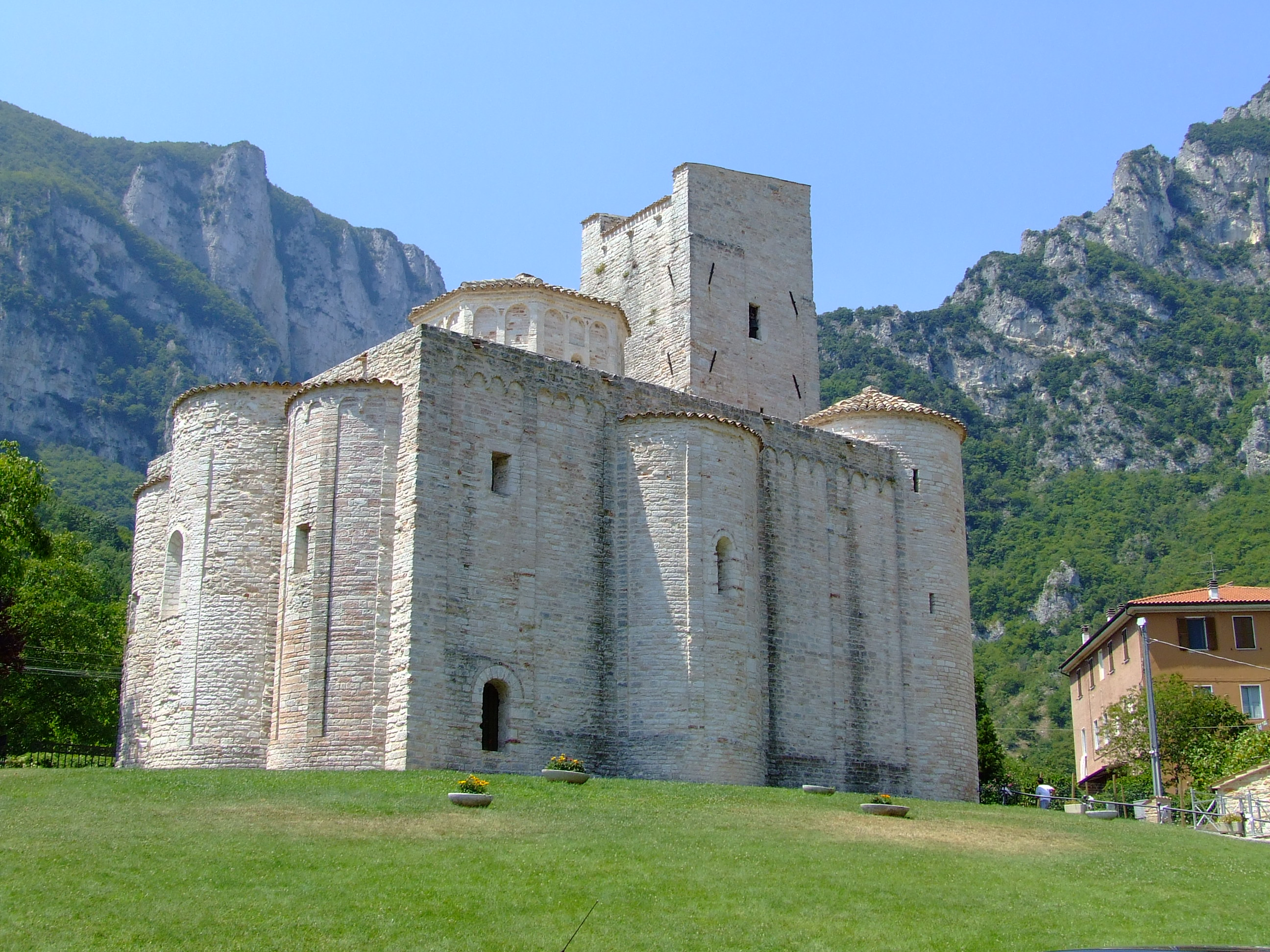
San Vittore alle Chiuse, Genga (1011)

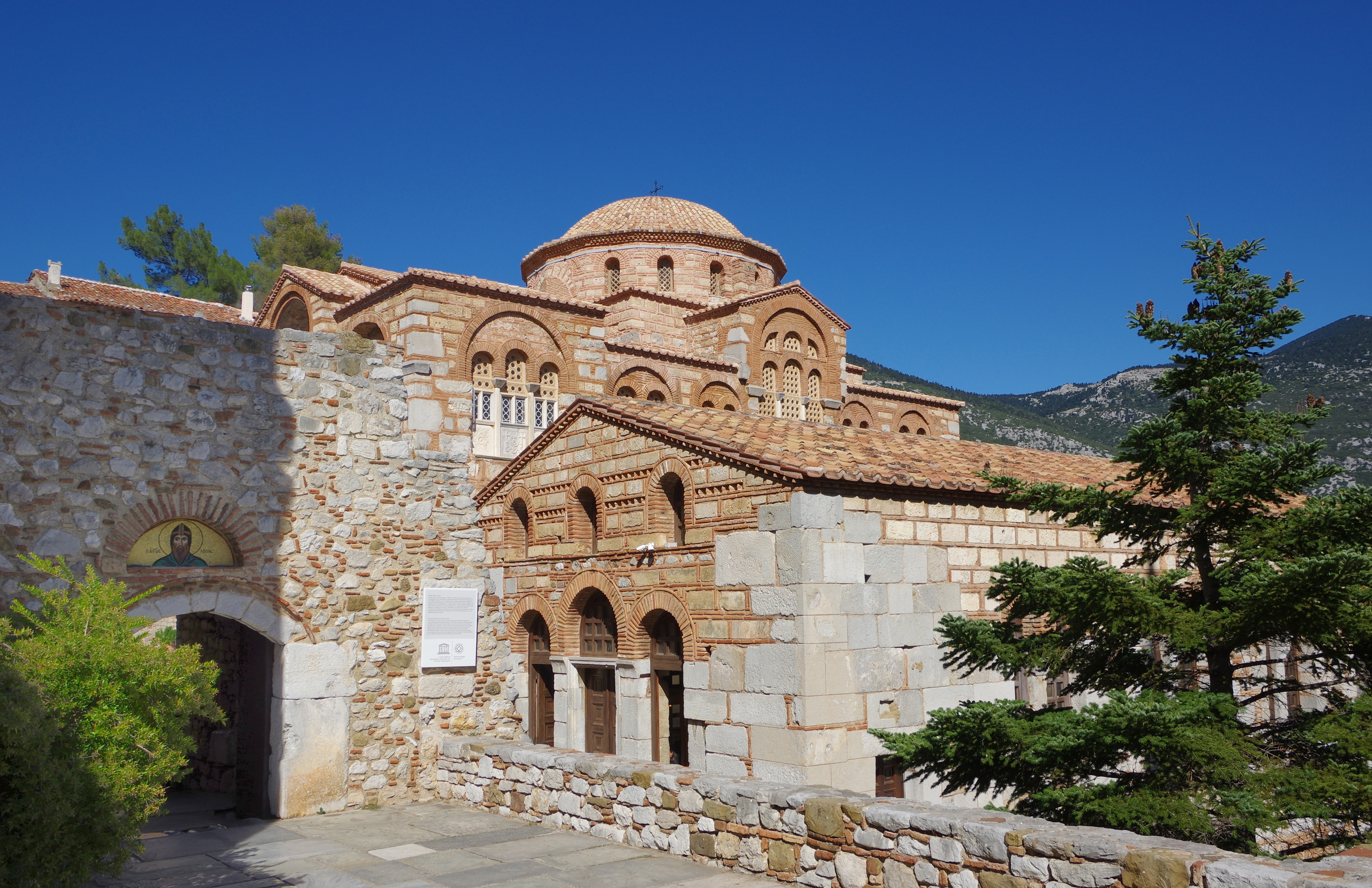
Katholikon, Hosios Loukas (1012)

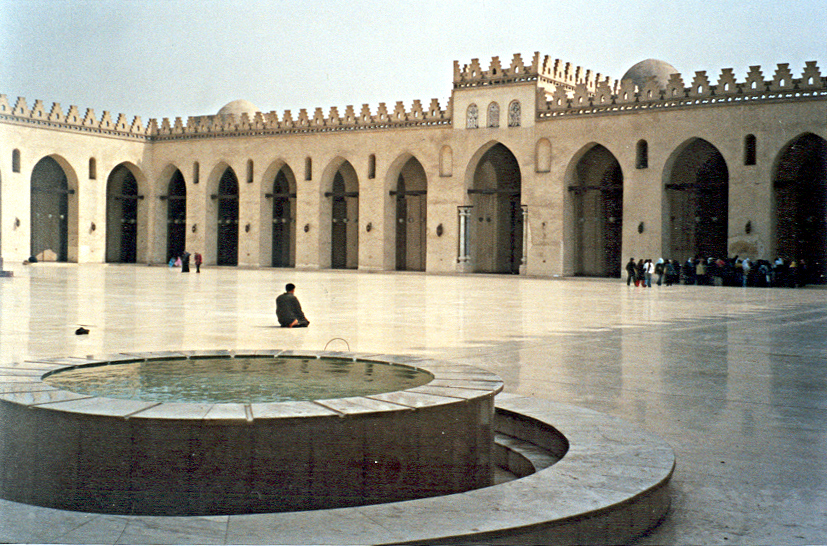
Al-Hakim Mosque, Cairo (1013)

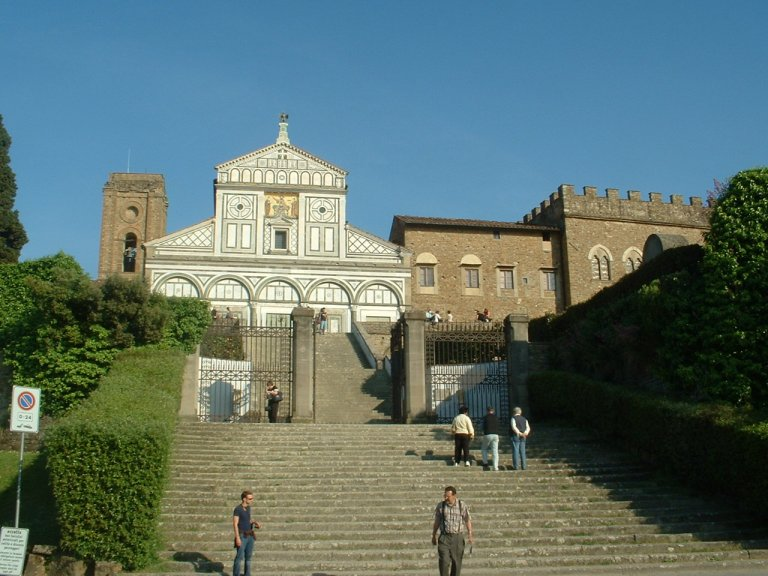
San Miniato al Monte, Florence (1013)

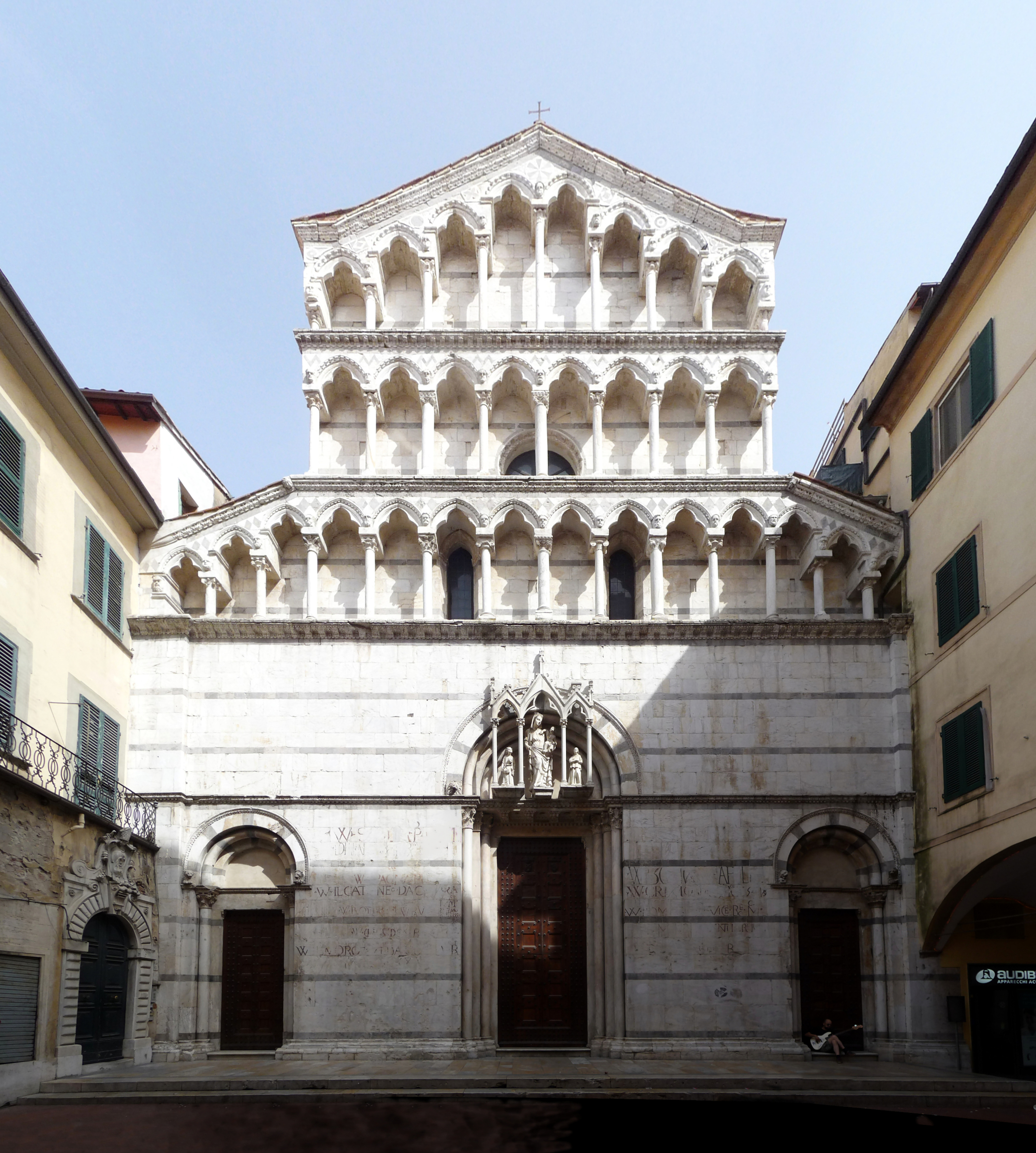
San Michele in Borgo, Pisa (1016)
