= 1050s in architecture =

- 1040s
- 1050s in architecture
- 1060s

Architecture timeline

== Buildings and structures ==
=== Buildings ===
- c. 1050
  - West Mebon built in Angkor.
  - Construction of Église Notre-Dame de l'Assomption, Rouffach, begins.
  - Parish church of St Mary the Virgin, Ovingham, Northumberland, England, consecrated.
- 1050
  - Construction of Basilica of Sant'Abbondio in Como, Lombardy begins.
  - Bernay Abbey, Normandy completed.
- 1053
  - Varadharaja Perumal Temple of Kanchipuram in India (Chola Empire) built.
  - Phoenix Hall of the Byōdō-in in Heian-kyō, Japan built.
- 1055 – Liaodi Pagoda (料敵塔), Hebei, China is completed
- 1056 – Sakyamuni Pagoda of Fogong Temple (佛宫寺释迦塔), Shanxi, China is completed
- 1057
  - Church of Monastery of San Salvador of Leyre, Navarra consecrated.
  - Near Caves (Pechersk Lavra) founded.
- 1059
  - Abbaye aux Dames, Caen founded.
  - Luoyang Bridge in China completed
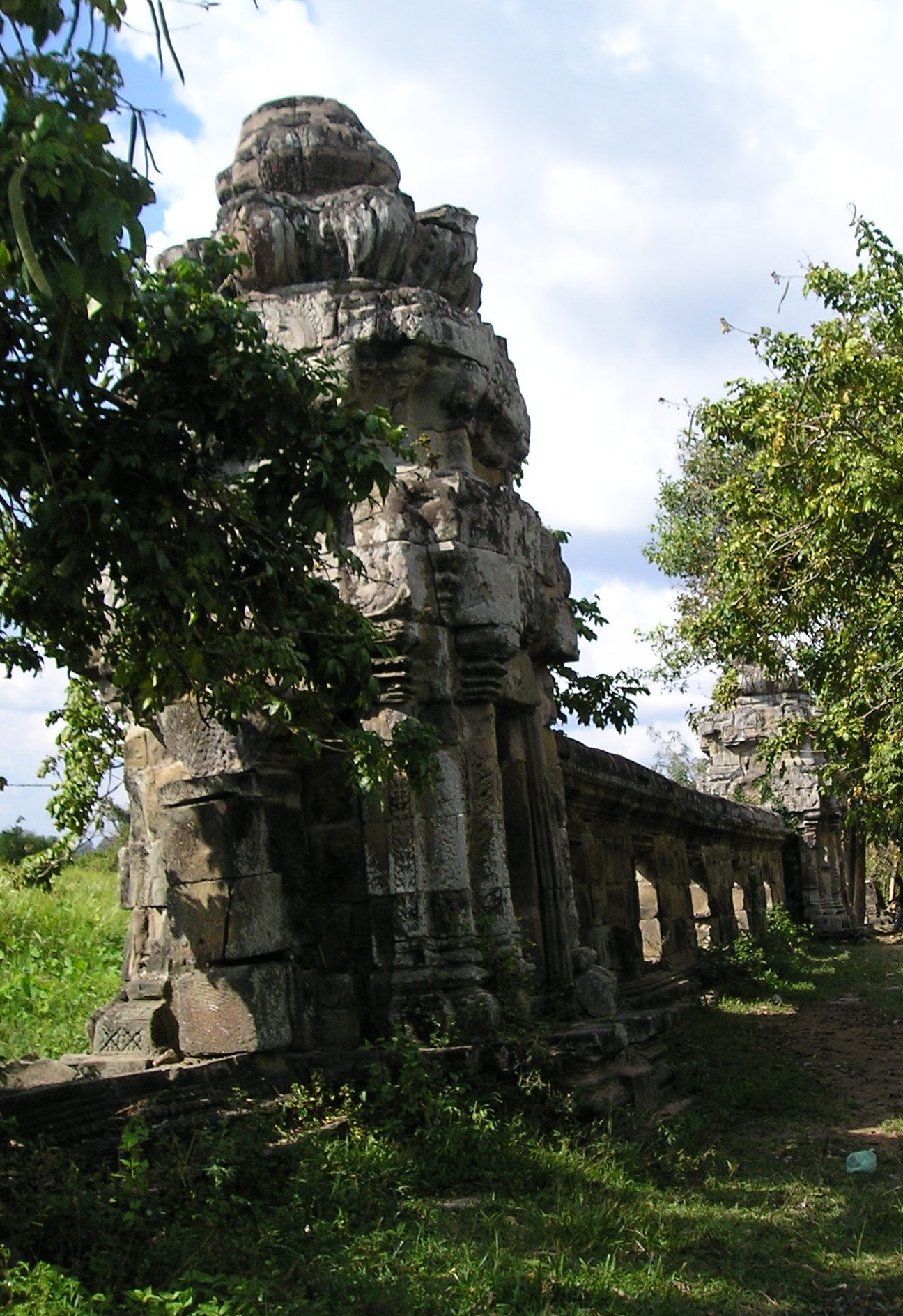
West Mebon, Angkor (c. 1150)

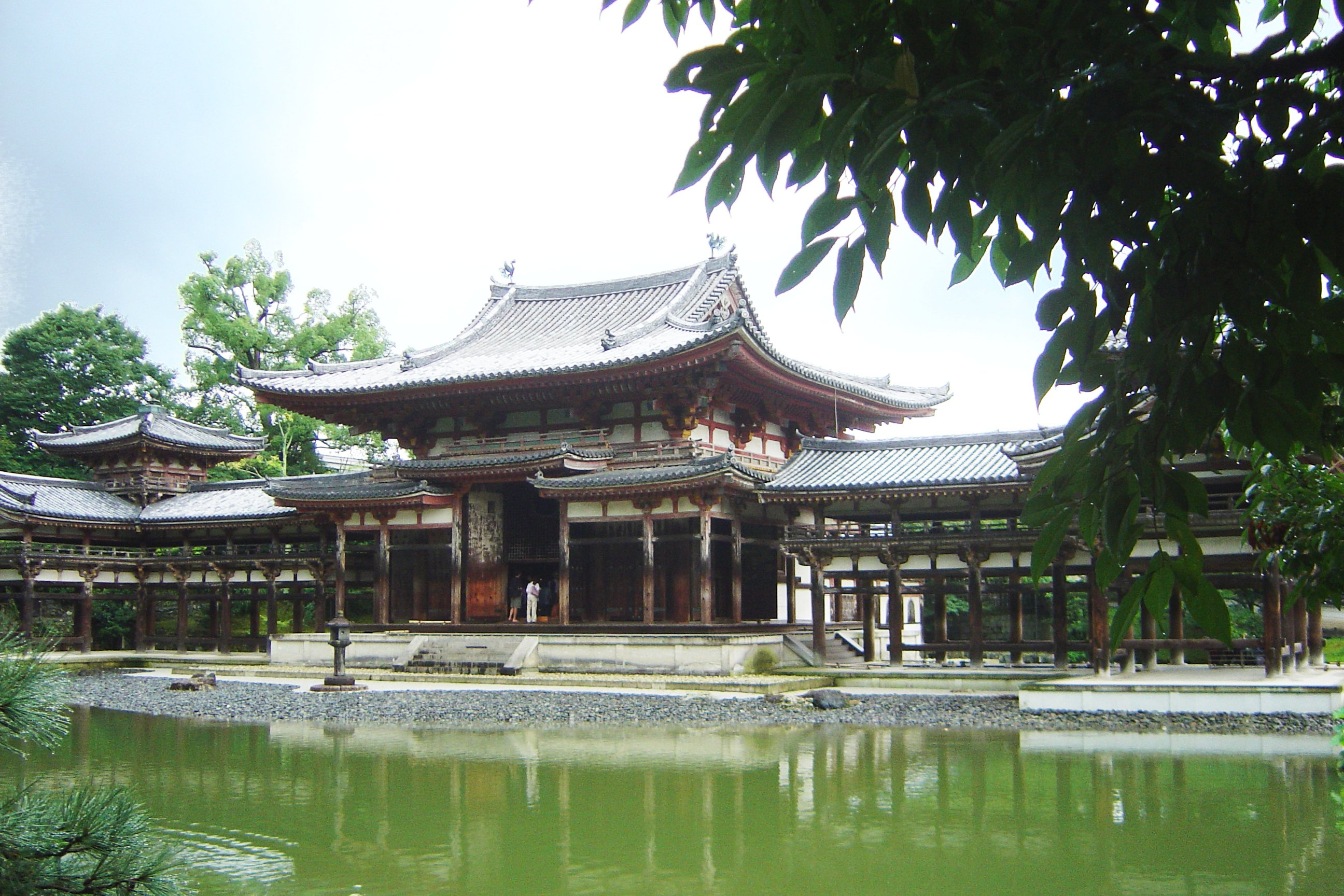
Phoenix Hall of the Byōdō-in, Kyōto (1053)

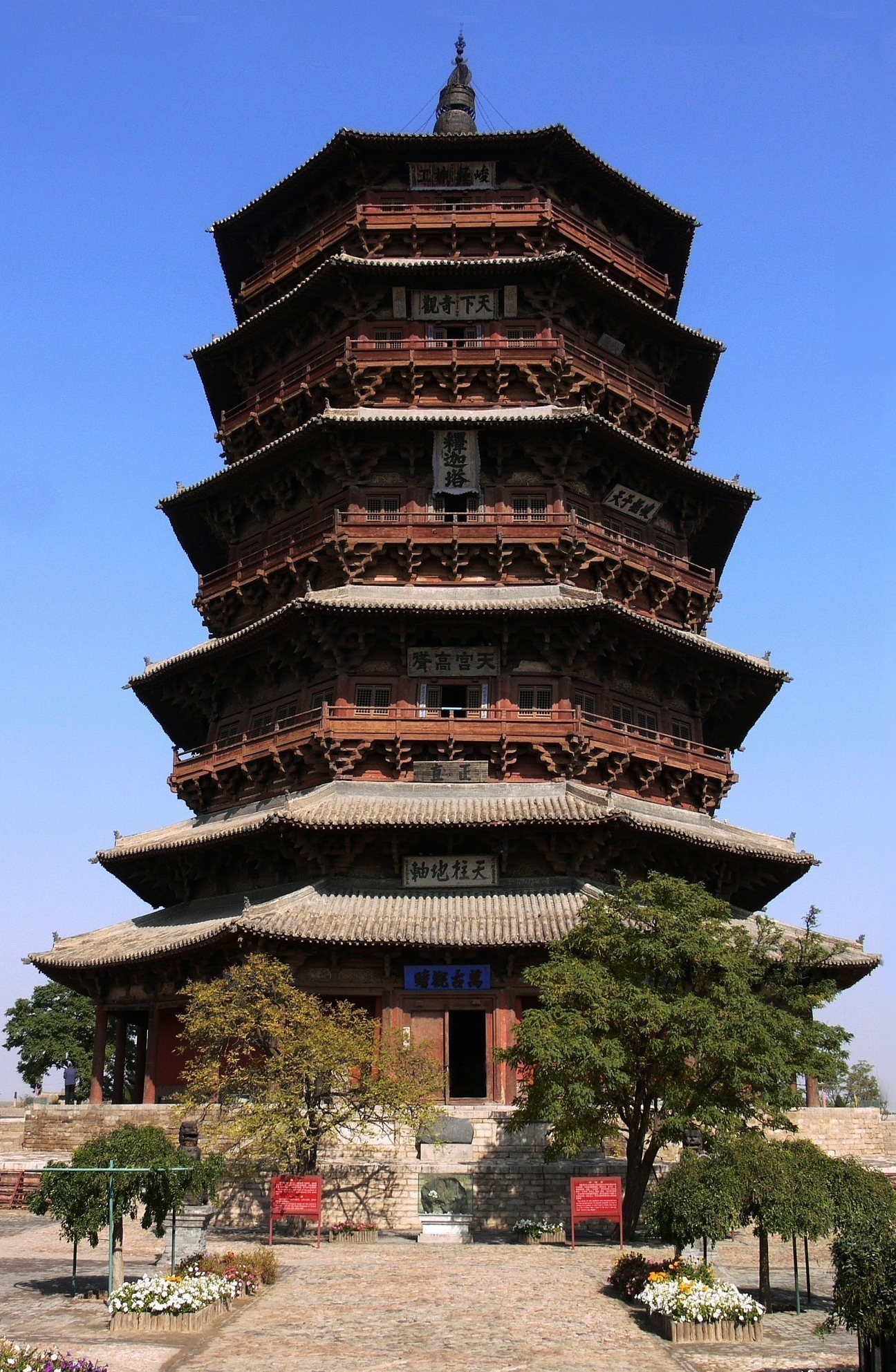
Pagoda of Fogong Temple (1056)

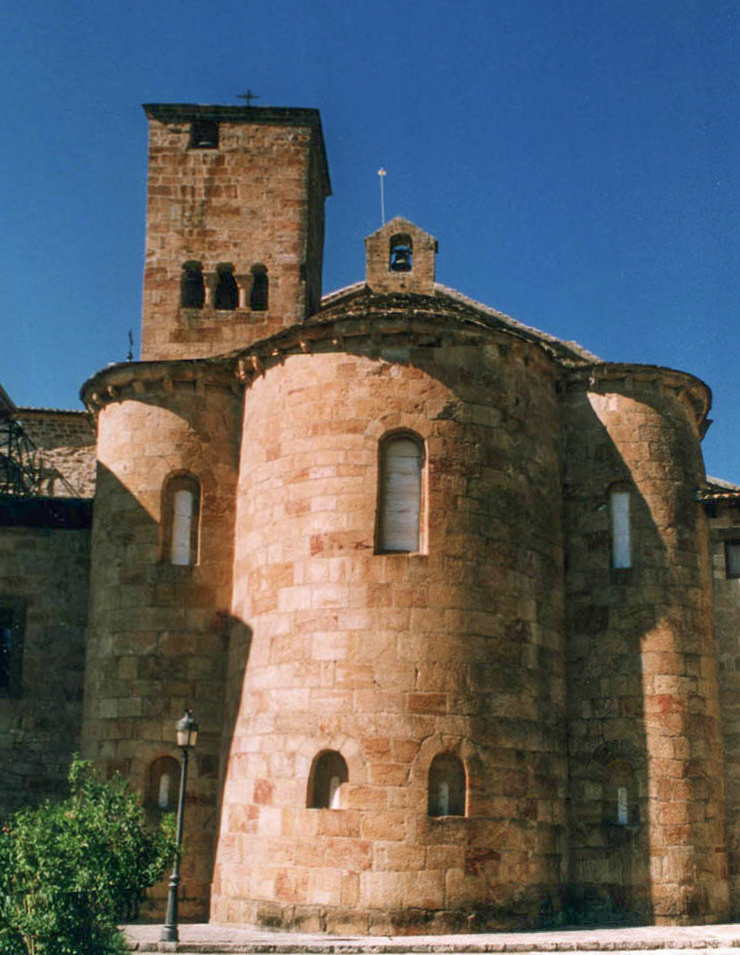
Monastery of San Salvador Church, Leyre (1057)

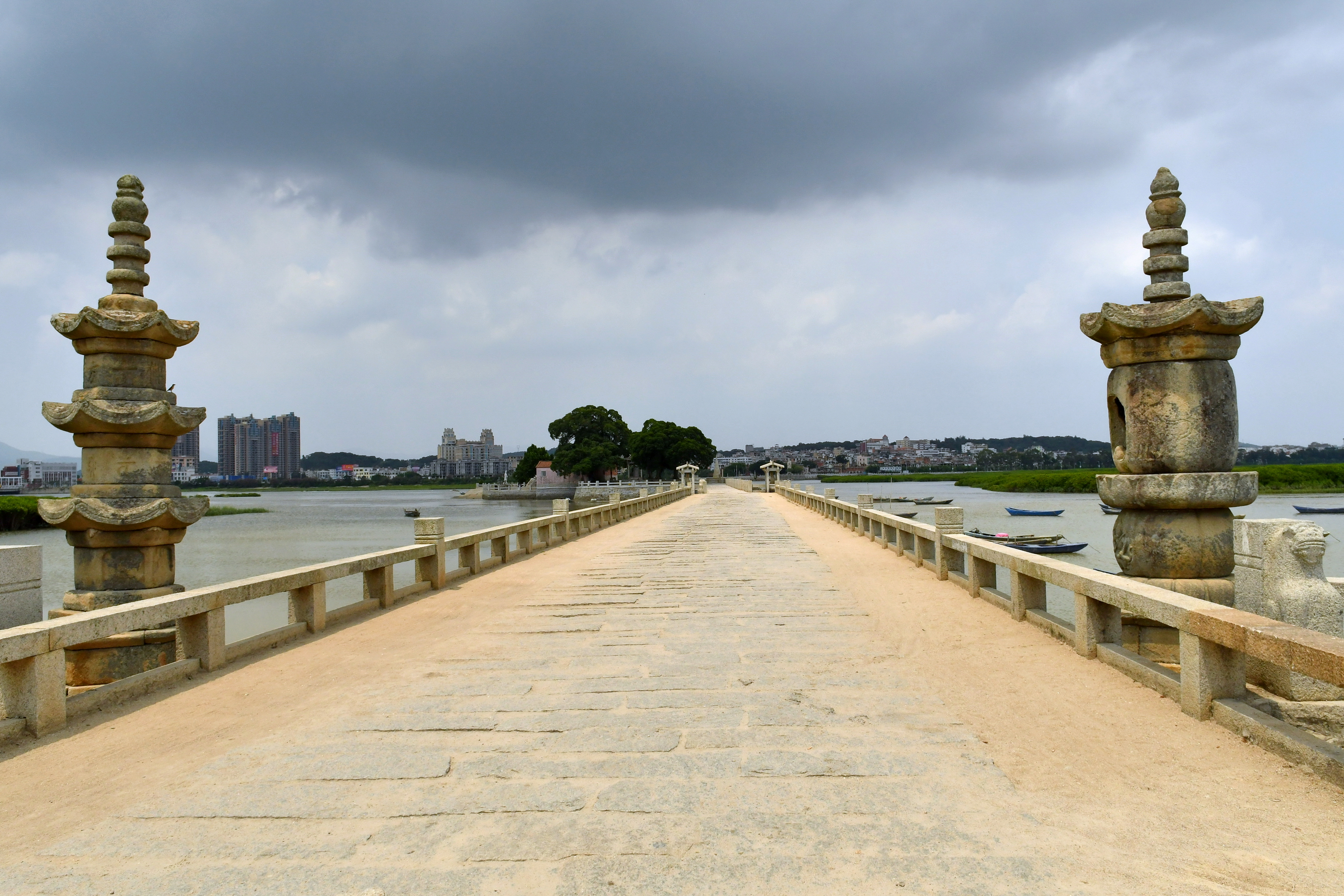
Luoyang Bridge (1059)
