= San Giovenale, Orvieto =

Church in Orvieto, Umbria, Italy

Coordinates: 42°43′10″N 12°06′13″E

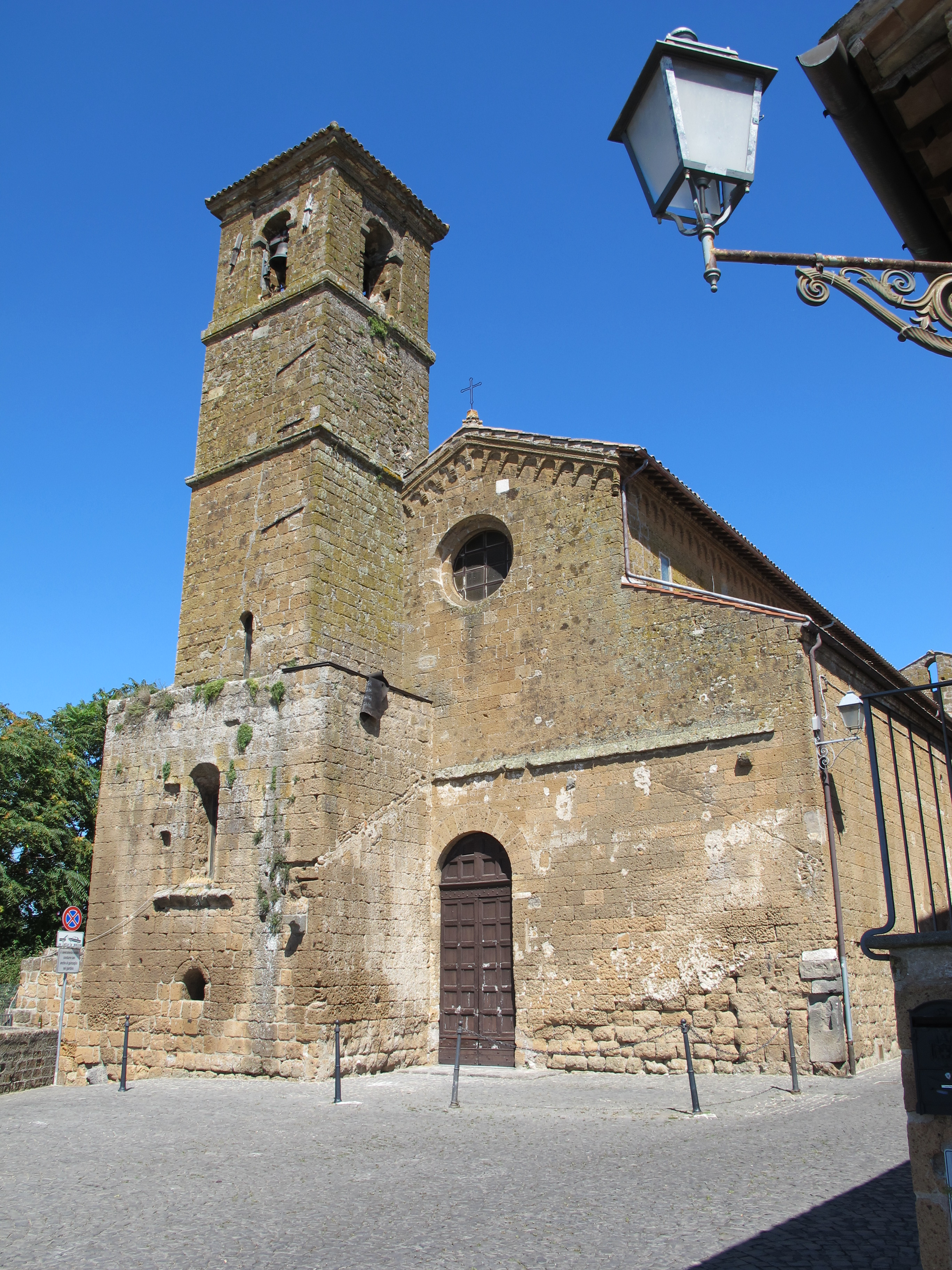
Chiesa di San Giovenale

Chiesa di San Giovenale is a church in Orvieto, Umbria, Italy. Initially constructed in 1004, it contains frescos and artworks from the 12th and 13th centuries. It belongs to the Roman Catholic Diocese of Orvieto-Todi.

== History ==
The church was built in 1004, possibly on the site of an Etruscan temple dedicated to Jupiter. There was an early Christian church on the site, probably from the 6th century, also dedicated to San Giovenale. It stood next to another religious building dedicated to San Savino, the only record of which is contained in a fresco by Ugolino di Prete Ilario now in Orvieto Cathedral. Construction of the 11th-century church was patronized by several rich families in the area and was documented as a parish church in 1028. An inscription on the high altar (GUIDO ABAS MCLXX) indicates that by 1170 it belonged to the order of monks known as Ordine Guglielmino. Circa 1248, when the monks left, the structure returned to being a parish church. Refurbished and reconsecrated by Bishop Giuseppe Marsciano in 1739, it fell under the care of the church of Sant'Agostino until 1810 when it came under the Franciscans. After the Franciscan community was suppressed in 1860, the church was returned to the diocese.

== Architecture ==
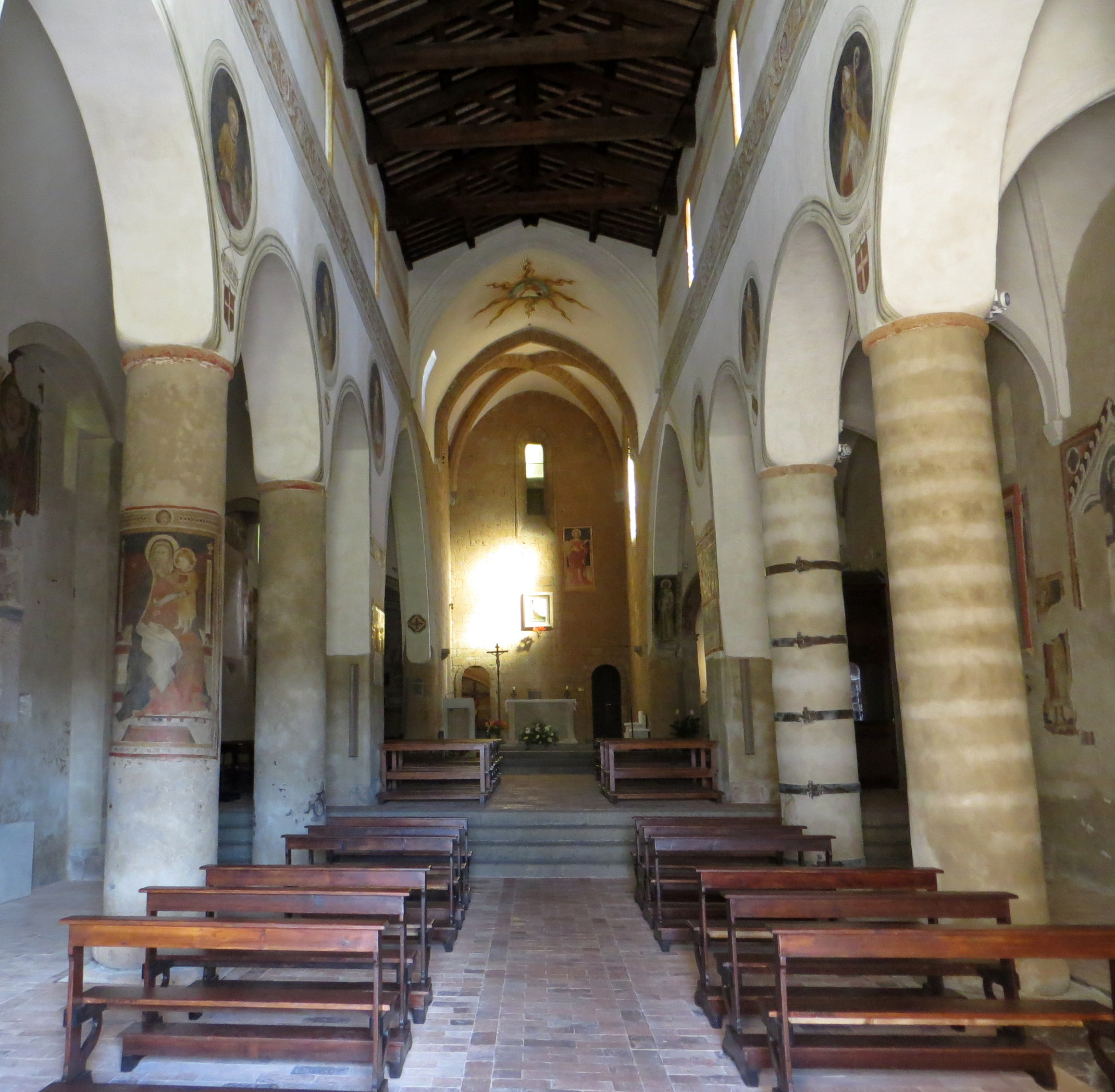
Interior

The church was initially constructed in the Romanesque style. A tall bell tower stands on the side of the bare facade. The semi-circular apse was removed when, in the 14th century, extensions at the eastern end in the Gothic style terminated in a rectangular apse. There are still traces of the Romanesque porch and the blind arches of the period. An inscription on the lateral door gives its date of construction as 1497. While the lower part of the building is original, the upper part was rebuilt in 1825.

== Interior and furnishings ==
The interior is rich in paintings from the 12th and 13th centuries including votive frescos by the Orvieto school which were recently recovered after being hidden by the Baroque remodeling of the interior in 1632. The most notable work is the 15th-century Maestà known as the Madonna del Soccorso which was donated by the Ghezzi family in the 16th century. It was rediscovered behind a silver screen in the 20th century. In view of the gold ground and the blue mantle, it seems to be late Italo-Byzantine in style. The marble altar, a fine example of Byzantine sculpture, bears the date 1170. It is flanked by late 13th-century marble lecterns bearing symbols of the Evangelists.

In the baptistry, there is a 14th-century fresco of the Ascension of Christ. The entrance is adorned with carved pavement slabs from the 9th century while the font is 15th century.

== Literature ==
- Pacetti, Carlo; Riccetti, Lucio (1983). L'antica chiesa di San Giovenale in Orvieto (in Italian).
