= 1040s in architecture =

- 1030s
- 1040s in architecture
- 1050s
Other topics in 1040s:
- Art

== Buildings and structures ==
=== Buildings ===
- 1040
  - Sant Vicenç de Cardona, Catalonia is completed.
  - Construction of Jumièges Abbey church in Normandy begins.
  - Construction of the third Würzburg Cathedral in the Holy Roman Empire begins.
- 1045 – Lingxiao Pagoda (凌霄塔) in Zhengding, China is completed.
- 1048 – Rebuilding of Church of the Holy Sepulchre in Jerusalem completed.
- 1049
  - Saint Rémi of Reims Basilica in France is consecrated
  - Iron Pagoda (鐵塔) of Bianjing, China is completed.
  - Abbey Church of Ottmarsheim, Alsace is consecrated.
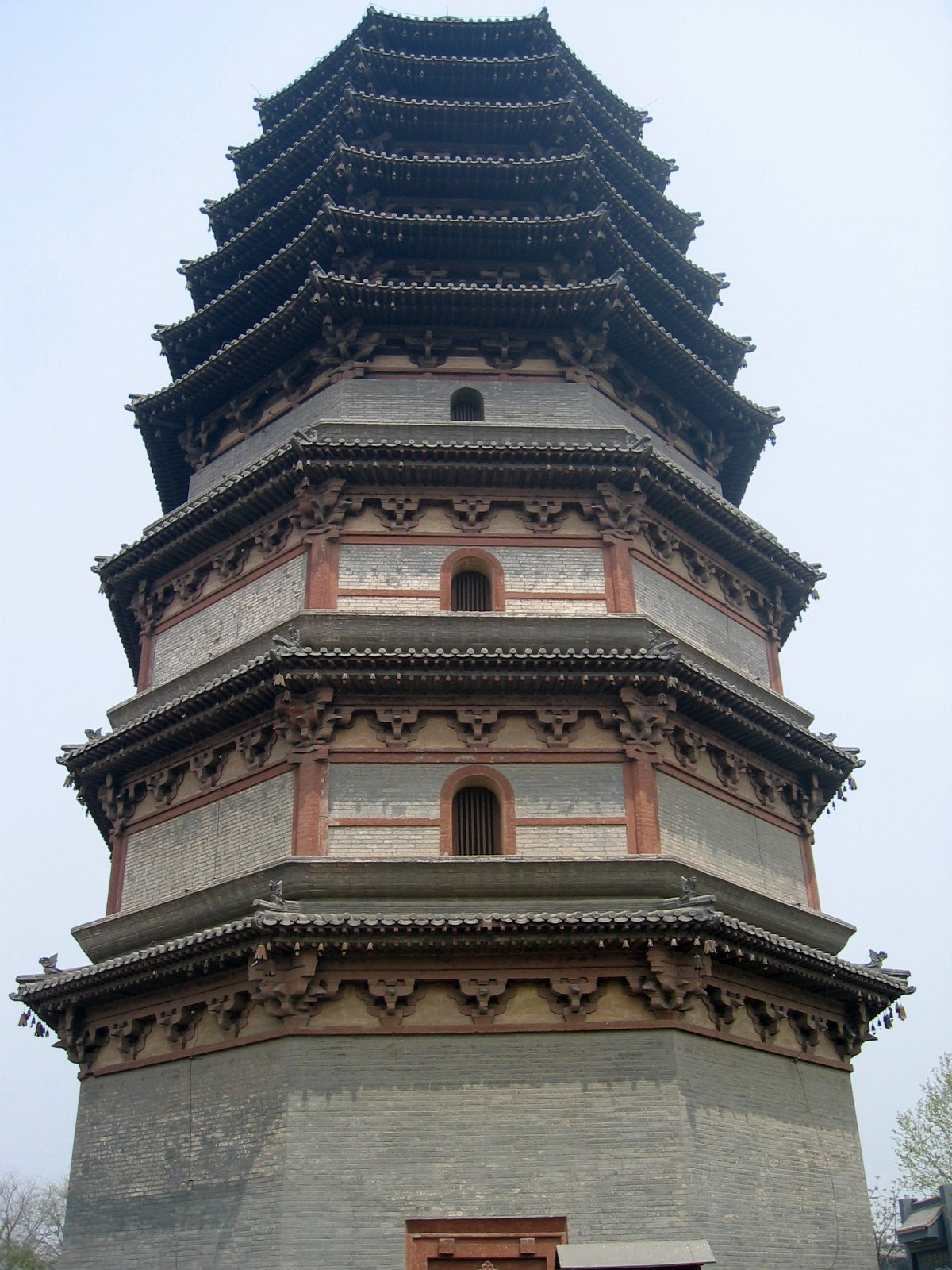
The Lingxiao Pagoda of Zhengding (1045)

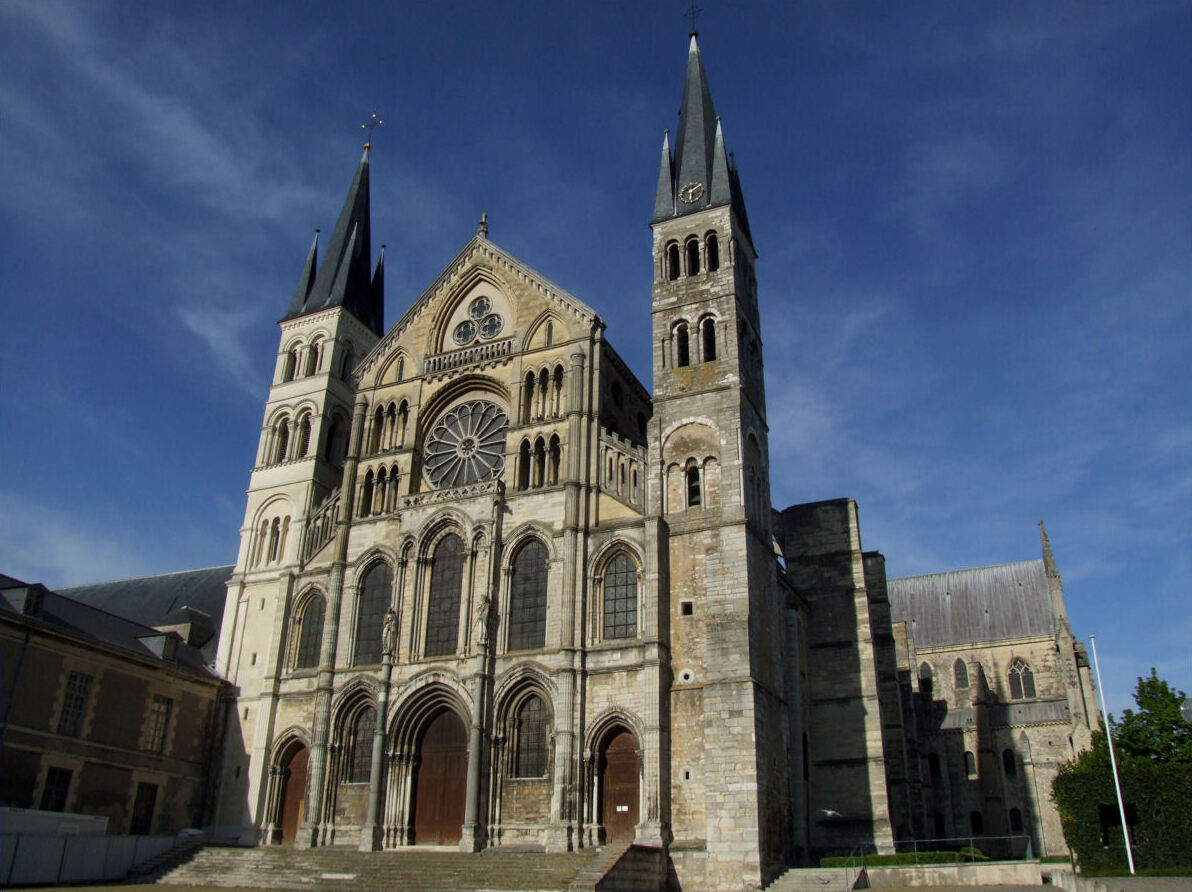
Saint Rémi of Reims Basilica (1049)

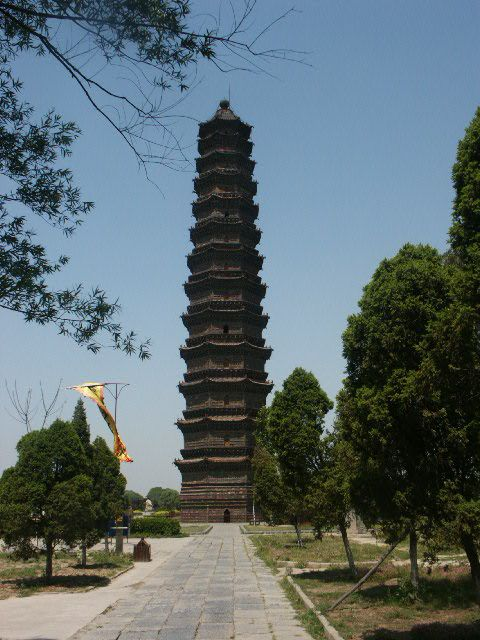
The Iron Pagoda of Kaifeng (1049)

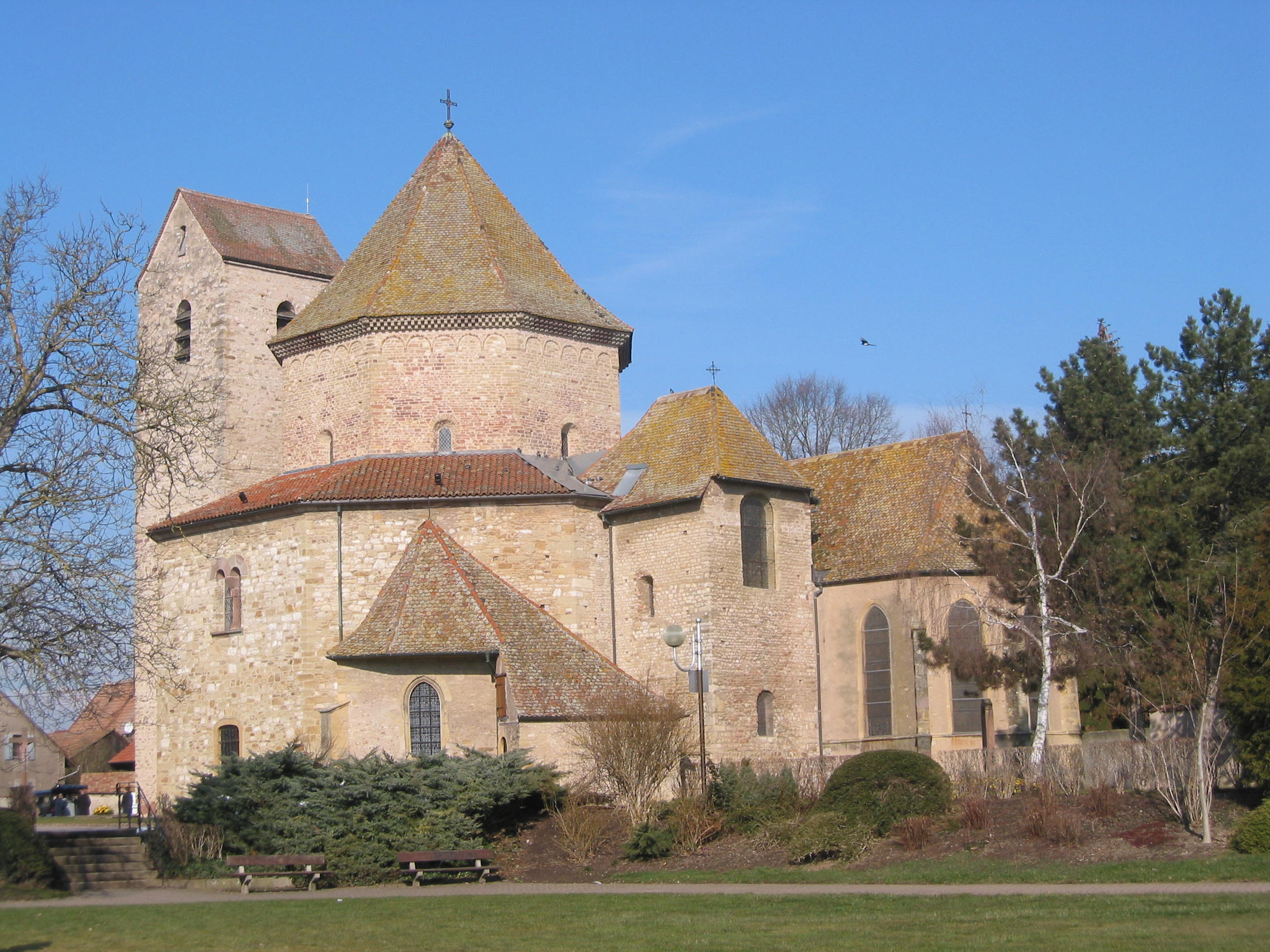
Ottmarsheim Abbey Church (1049)
