= 1060s in architecture =

- 1050s
- 1060s in architecture
- 1070s

Architecture timeline

== Buildings and structures ==
=== Buildings ===
- 1060 – Nave of new Mont Saint Michel Abbey in Normandy begun.
- c.1060
  - Construction of the Baphuon in Yasodharapura, Khmer Empire.
  - Lawkananda Pagoda built in Bagan, Pagan Kingdom.
  - Shwezigon Pagoda in Nyaung-U, Pagan Kingdom, begun.
  - Church of St. Philibert, Tournus in Burgundy completed.
  - St Gregory's Minster, Kirkdale in England built.
- 1061 – Speyer Cathedral, Germany, consecrated.
- 1062 – Construction of Abbey of Sainte-Trinité, Caen, Normandy begun.
- 1062 – Vamana temple is built in Khajuraho, Chandela kingdom.
- 1063
  - Pisa Cathedral in Piazza dei Miracoli, Pisa, March of Tuscany begun.
  - Rebuilding of Doge's Palace, Venice begun.
  - Basilica of San Isidoro, León, Spain consecrated.
- c.1063
  - Abbey of Saint-Étienne, Caen, Normandy founded.
  - Greensted Church, Essex, England, built.
- 1064 – Abbey of Lessay, Normandy begun.
- 1065 – St. Maria im Kapitol, Cologne consecrated.
- 1066 – Church of San Martín de Tours de Frómista, Spain known.
- 1067
  - Jumièges Abbey church in Normandy consecrated in the presence of William the Conqueror.
  - First of the Kharraqan towers built in Qazvin, Seljukid Iran.
  - St. Gereon's church, Cologne begun.
- 1068 – William the Conqueror orders the construction of new motte-and-bailey castles in England at Warwick, Nottingham, Lincoln, Huntingdon, Cambridge and York.
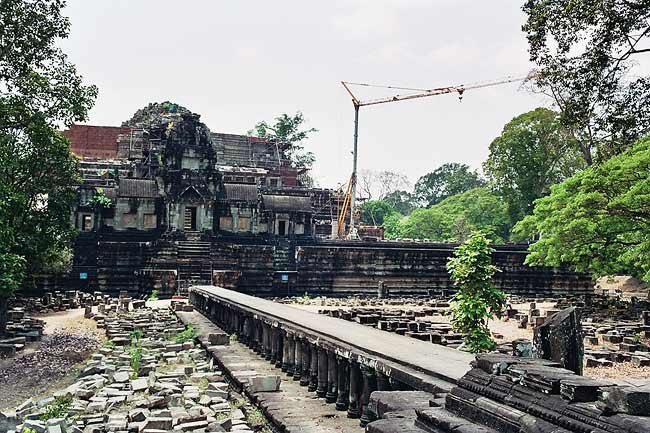
Baphuon of Yasodharapura (c. 1060)

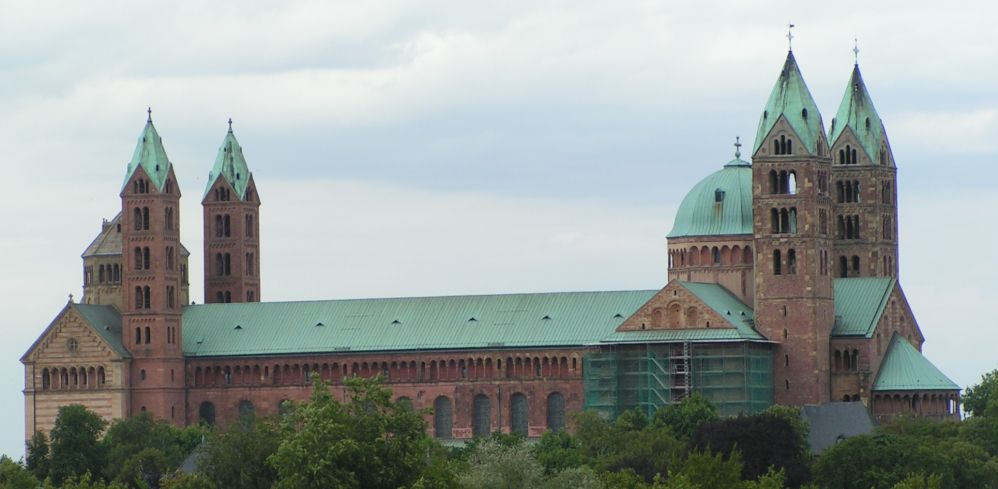
Speyer Cathedral (1061)

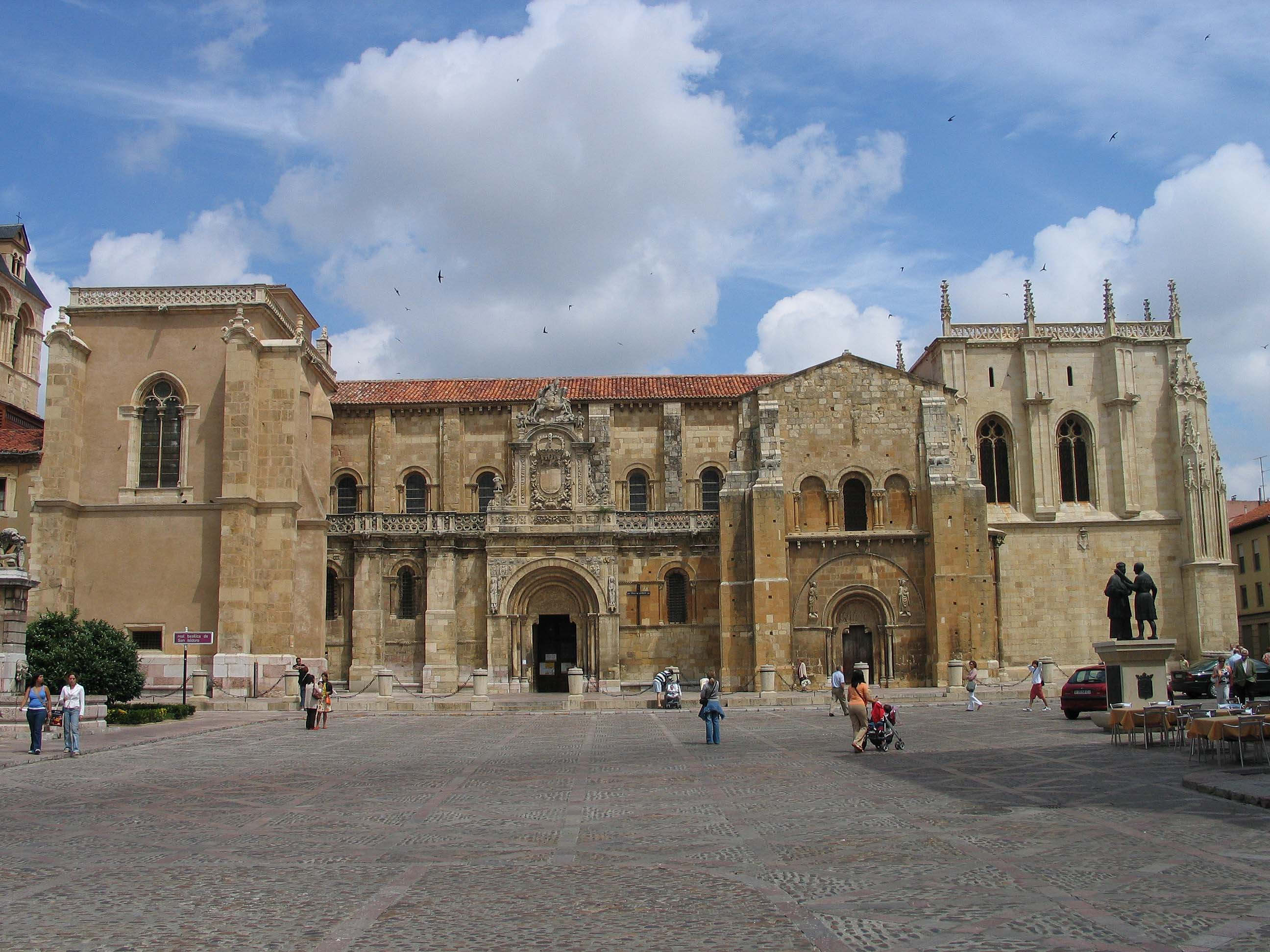
Basilica of San Isidoro, León (1063)

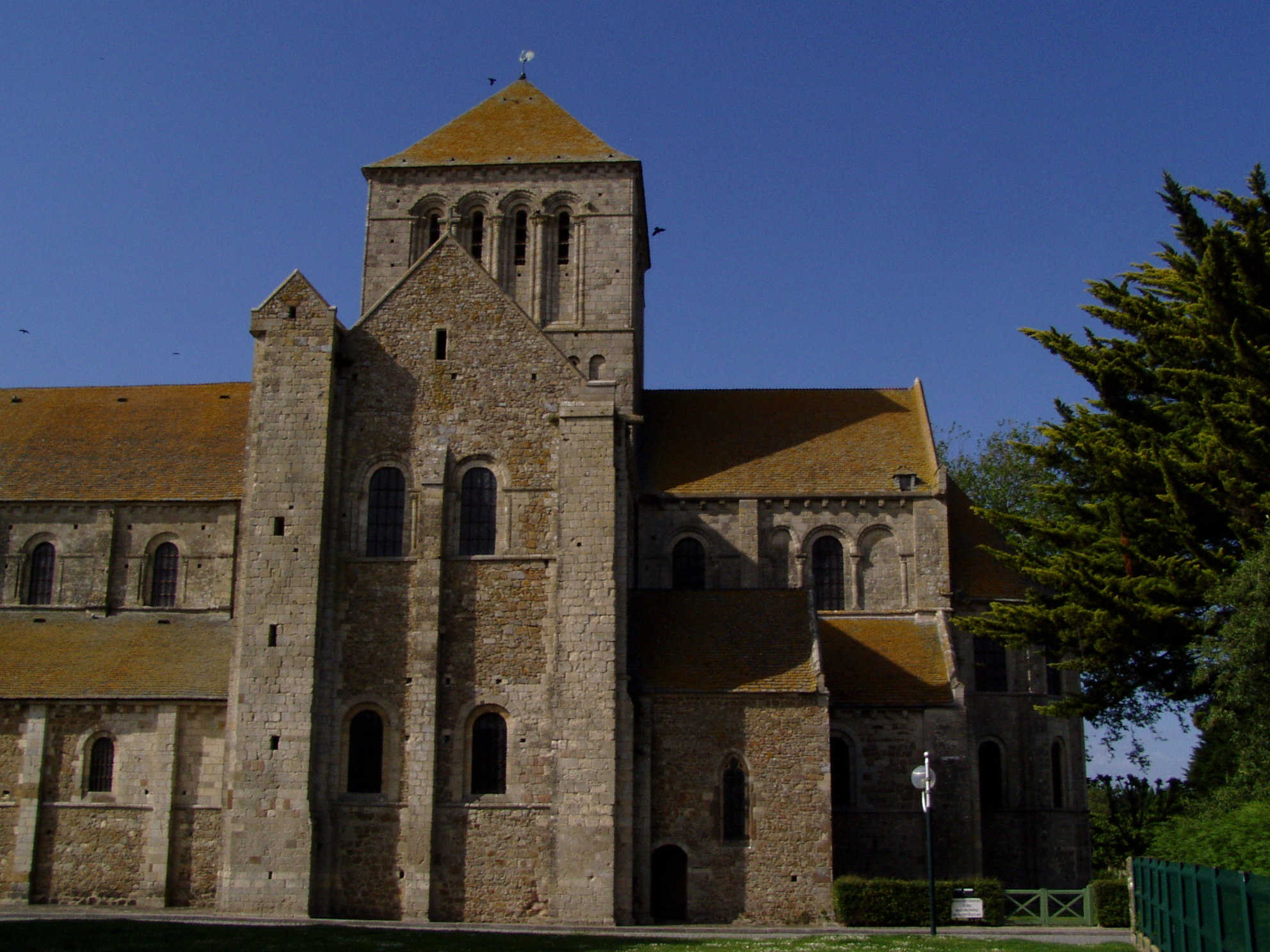
Abbey of Lessay

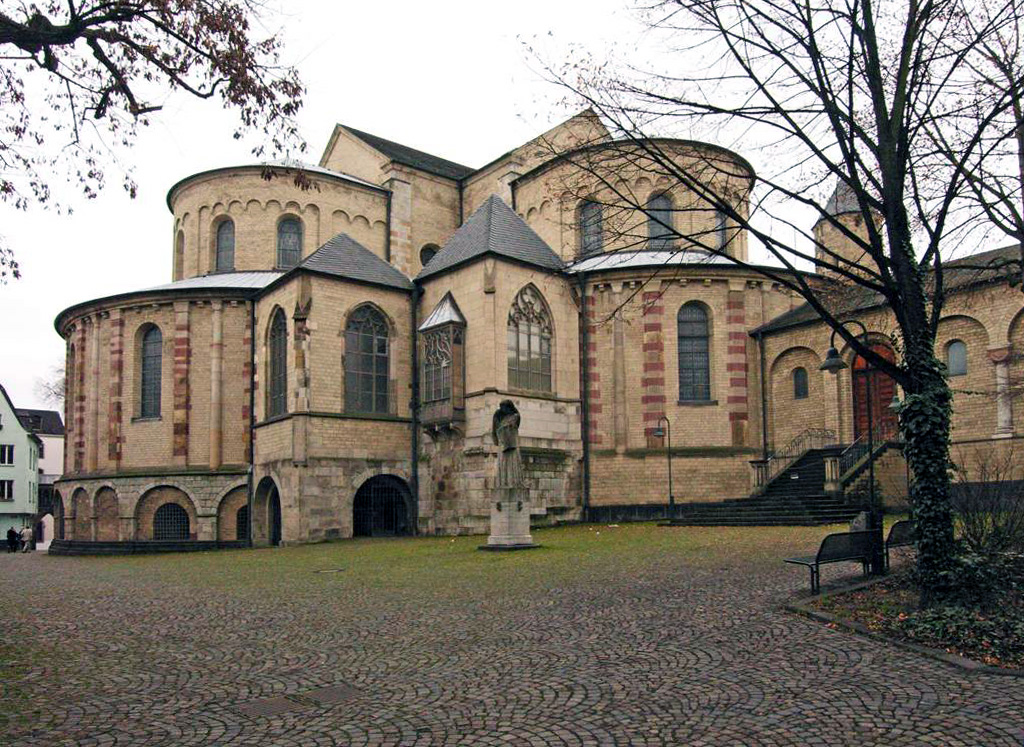
St. Maria im Kapitol, Cologne (1065)

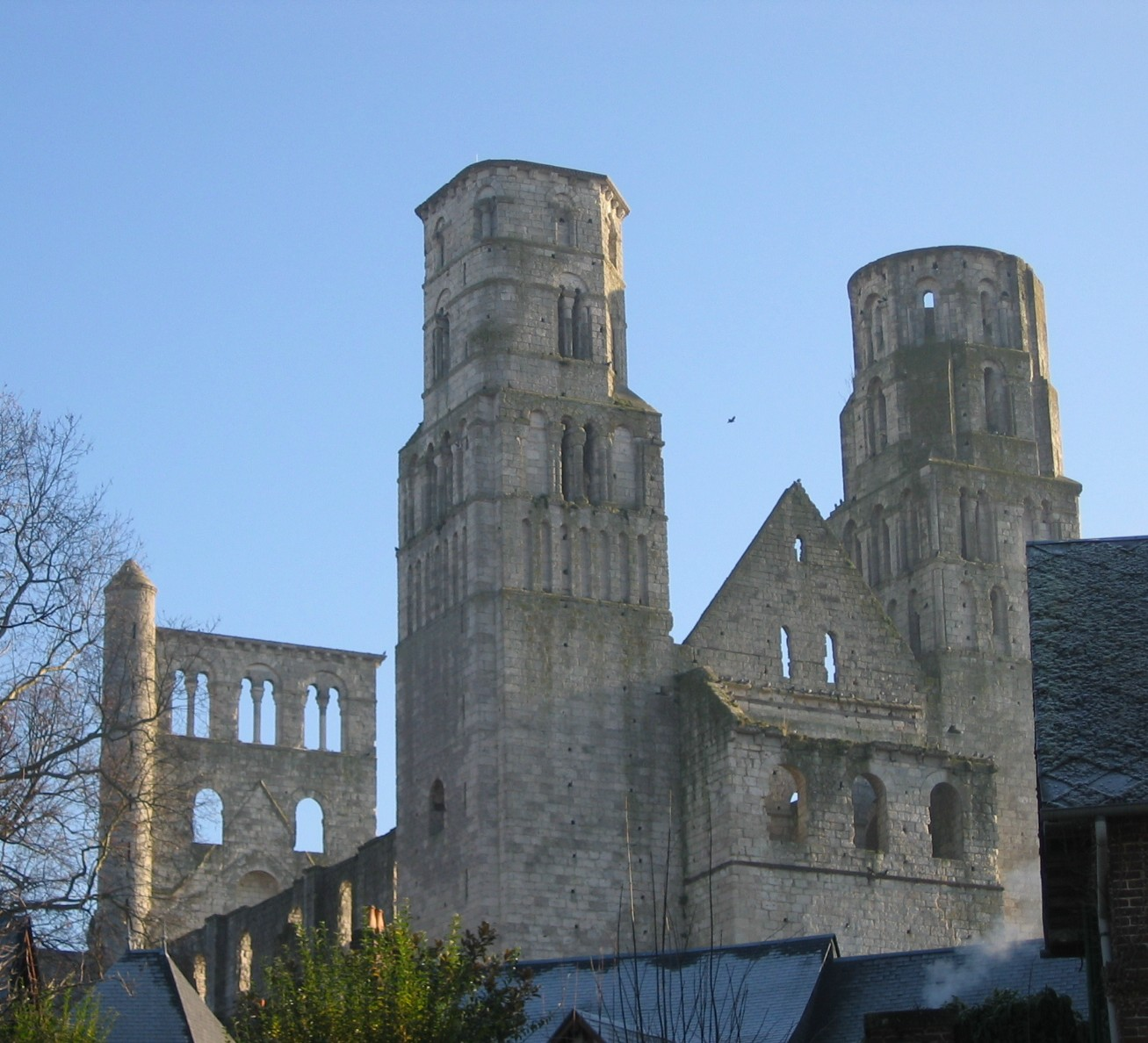
Jumièges Abbey (1067)
