= 1200s in architecture =

- 1190s
- 1200s in architecture
- 1210s
Other topics in 1200s:
- Art
- Music

Architecture timeline

== Buildings and structures ==
=== Buildings ===
- c. 1200
  - Banteay Kdei temple built in Angkor, Khmer Empire.
  - St Hilda's Church, Hartlepool built in England.
  - Borgund Stave Church and Heddal Stave Church built in Norway.
- 1200 – Qutb Minar minaret in the Delhi Sultanate begun.
- 1201 – Cloth Hall, Ypres, begun.
- 1202 – Rouen Cathedral begun.
- 1206 – Göğceli Mosque, Çarşamba, built.
- c. 1206 – Cathedral of Amalfi in the Kingdom of Sicily completed.
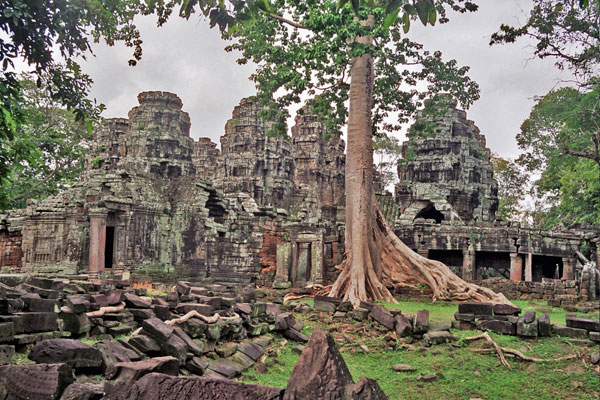
Banteay Kdei, Angkor (c. 1200)

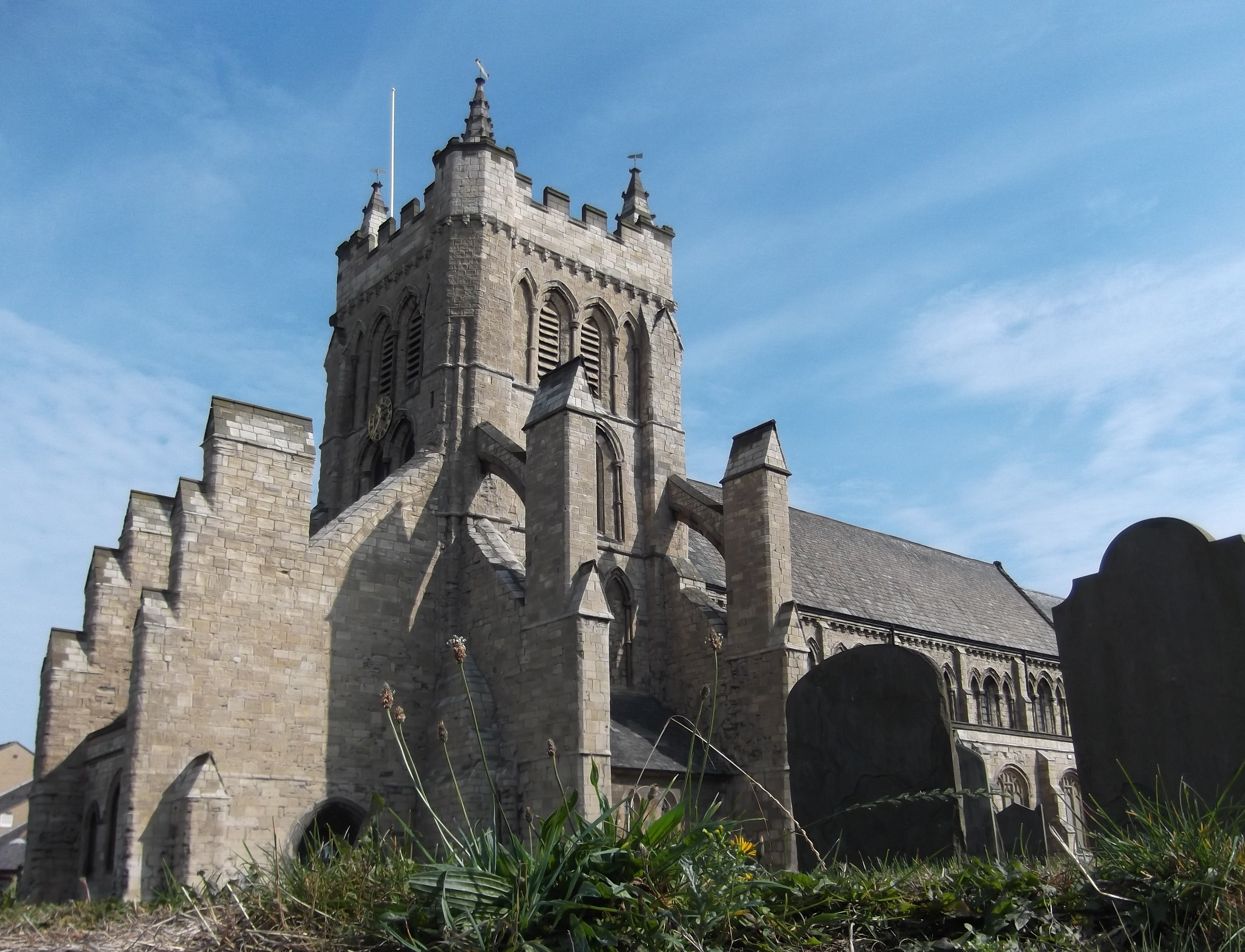
St Hilda's, Hartlepool (c. 1200)

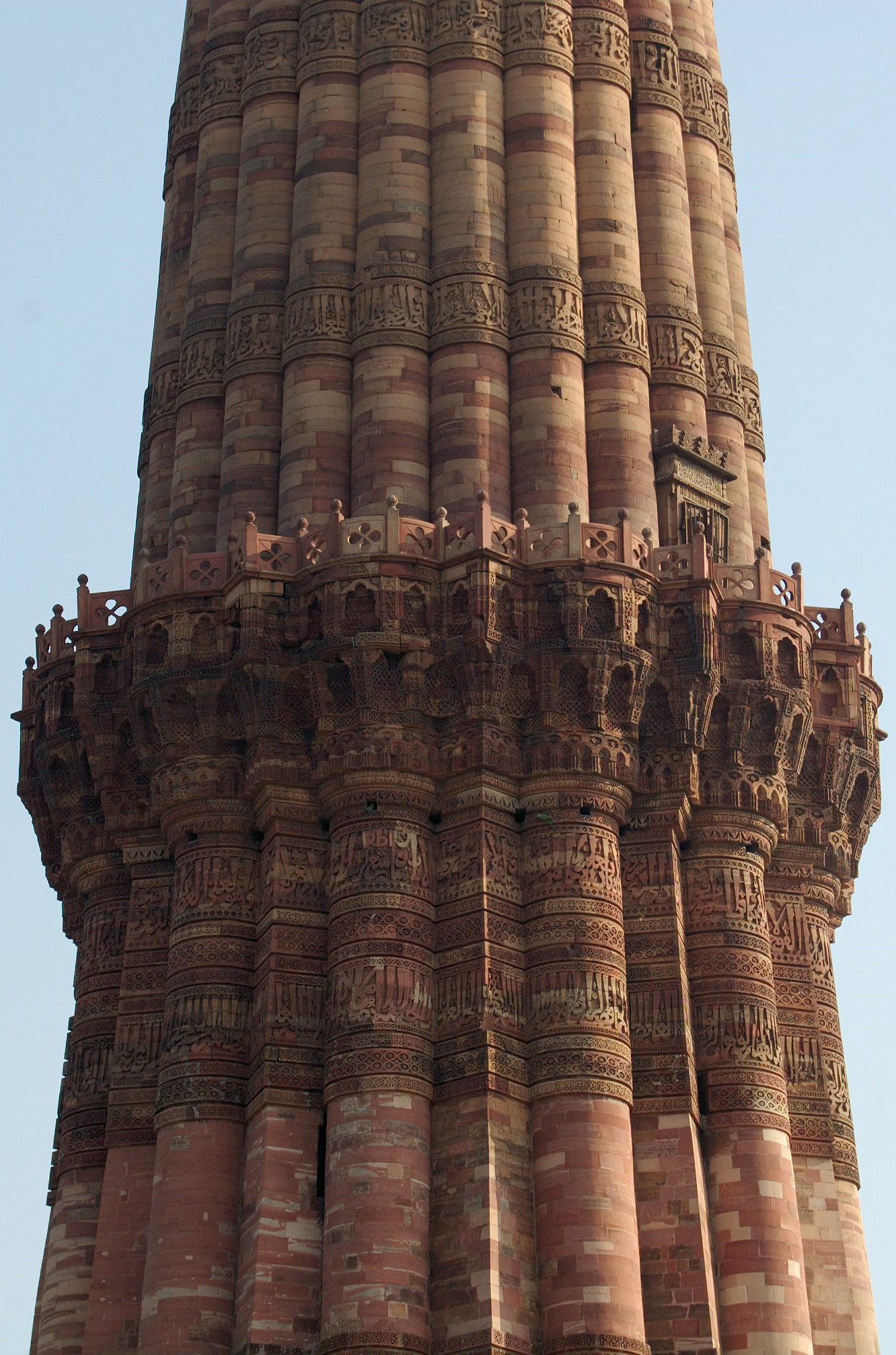
Qutb Minar (1200- )

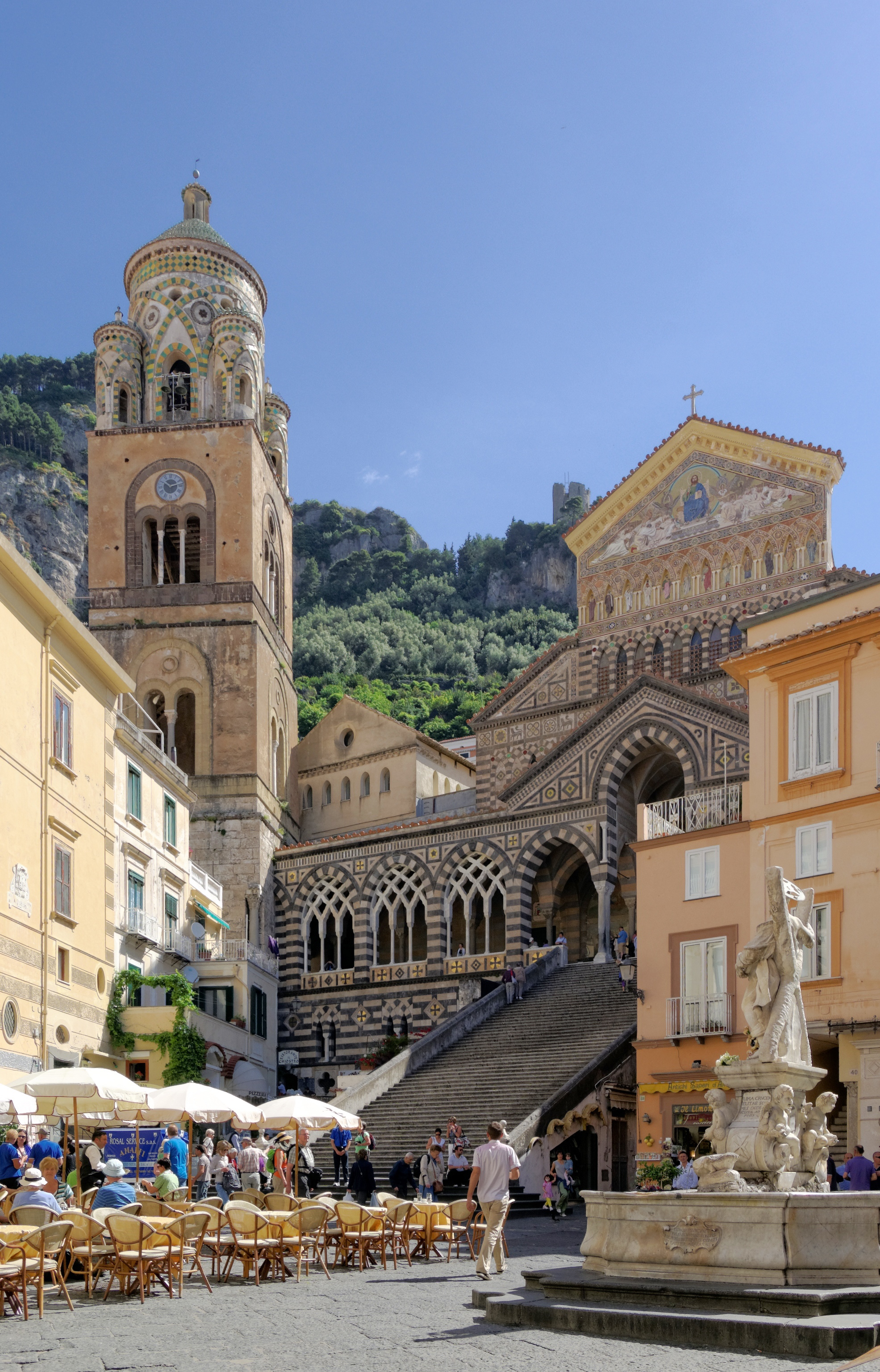
Amalfi Cathedral (c. 1206)
