= Kumarlı =

Kumarlı may refer to:

- Kumarli, Iran, a town located in Tehran, Iran
- Kumarlı, Kahramanmaraş, a town situated in the central (Kahramanmaraş) district of Kahramanmaraş Province, Turkey
- Kumarlı, Çarşamba, a village in the district of Çarşamba, Samsun Province, Turkey
- Kumarlı, a former name of Ören, a village in the district of Boyabat, Sinop Province, Turkey
