= 1180s in architecture =

- 1170s
- 1180s in architecture
- 1190s

Architecture timeline

== Buildings and structures ==
=== Buildings ===
- about 1180
  - Reconstruction of the nave and transept of St. Sernin's Basilica, Toulouse, France completed.
  - Reconstruction of St. Faith's Church, Sélestat, Alsace completed.
  - Construction of Borgund Stave Church, Norway, begun.
  - Färlöv Church, Sweden, built.
  - Moyse's Hall, Bury St Edmunds, England, built.
- 1181 – Worms Cathedral in Germany mostly finished.
- 1183 – Cathedral of Monreale, Sicily, built.
- 1184 – Modena Cathedral consecrated.
- by about 1185 – Construction of Christ Church Cathedral, Oxford, England as the church of the Priory of St Frideswide substantially completed.
- 1185
  - Reconstruction of Basle Cathedral begins.
  - Temple Church in London dedicated.
  - Pont Saint-Bénezet, a bridge in Avignon, in southern France, completed.
- 1189 – Rebuilding of Chengling Pagoda (澄灵塔) of Zhengding in Jin dynasty China is completed (begun 1161).
- 1186 – Ta Prohm temple built in Angkor.
- 1188
  - Ourense Cathedral in Galicia (Spain) consecrated.
  - Church of St Thomas of Canterbury, Portsmouth, England, consecrated.
- Main period of work on Dover Castle in England.
- New circular keep of Conisbrough Castle in Yorkshire, England, built by Hamelin de Warenne, Earl of Surrey.
- Reconstruction of Chichester Cathedral in England begins.
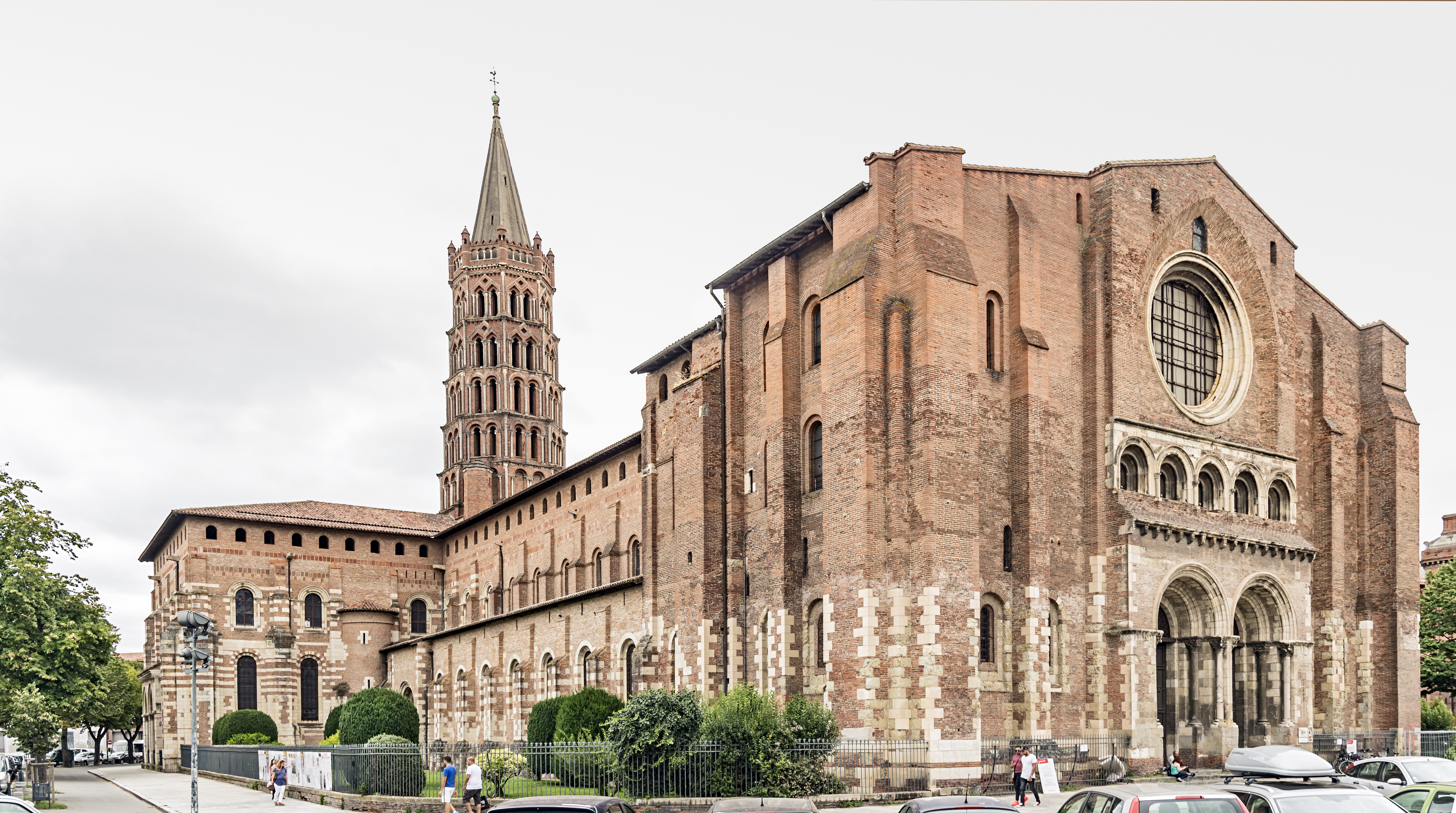
St. Sernin's Basilica, Toulouse (1180)

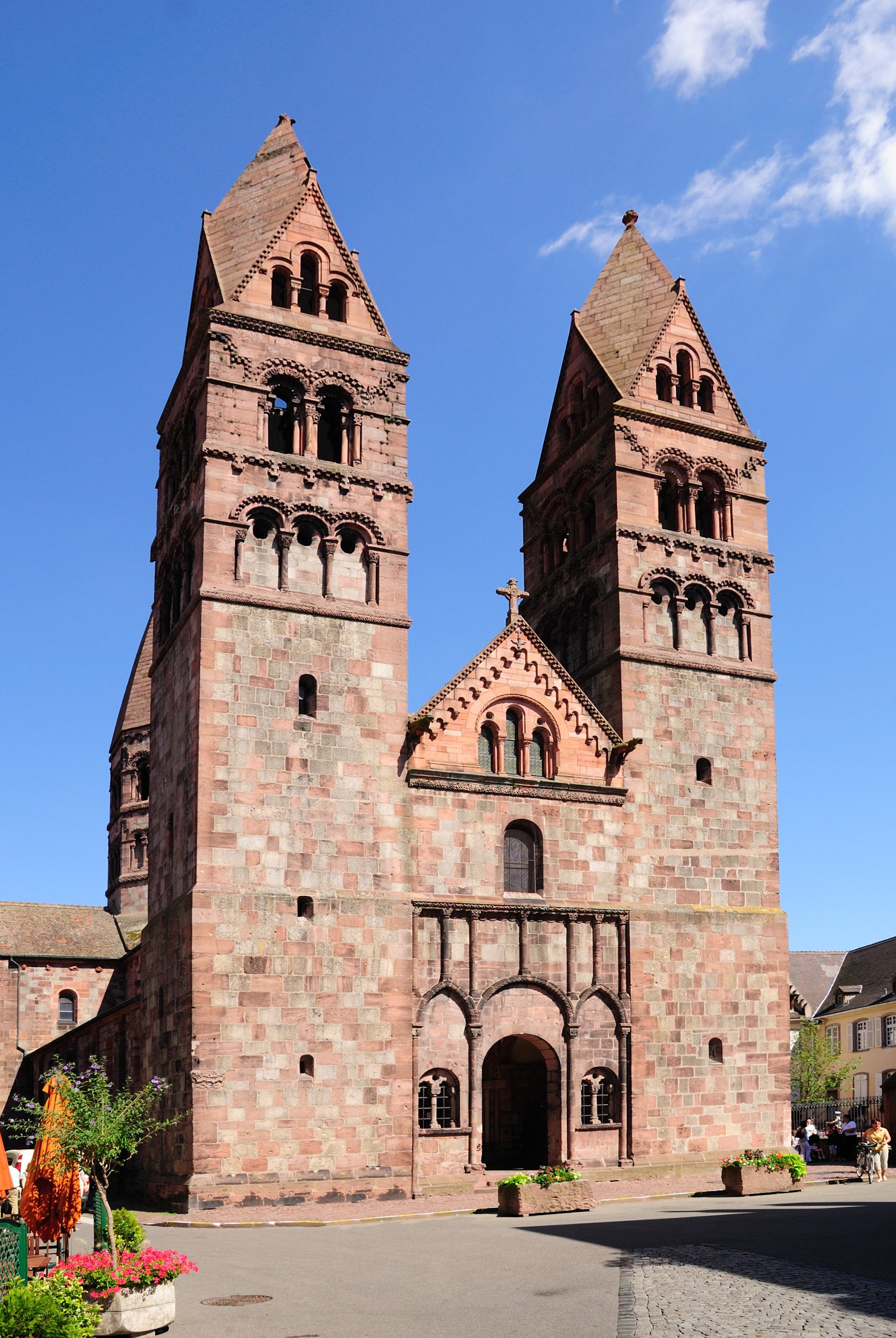
St. Faith's Church, Selestat (1180)

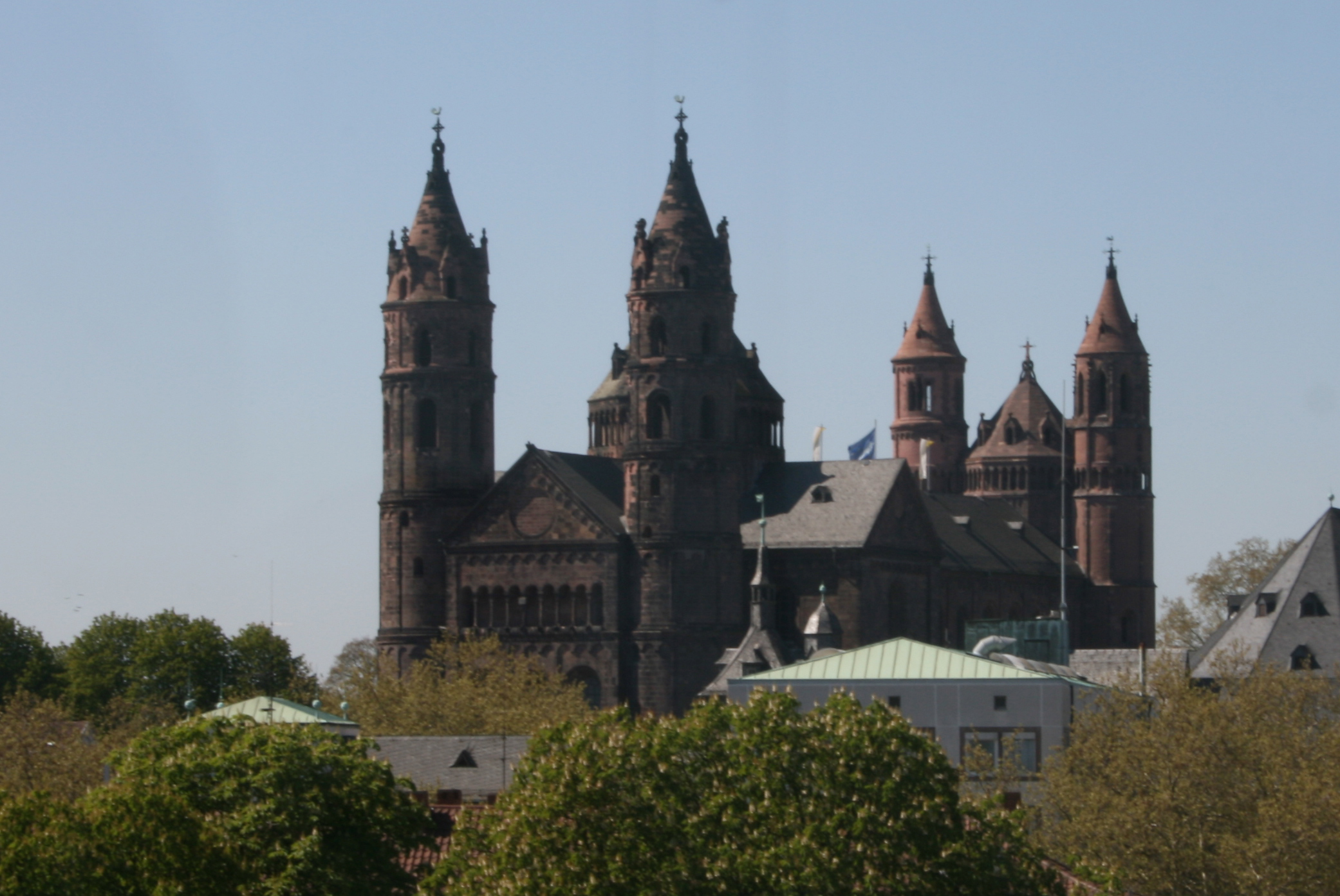
Worms Cathedral (1181)

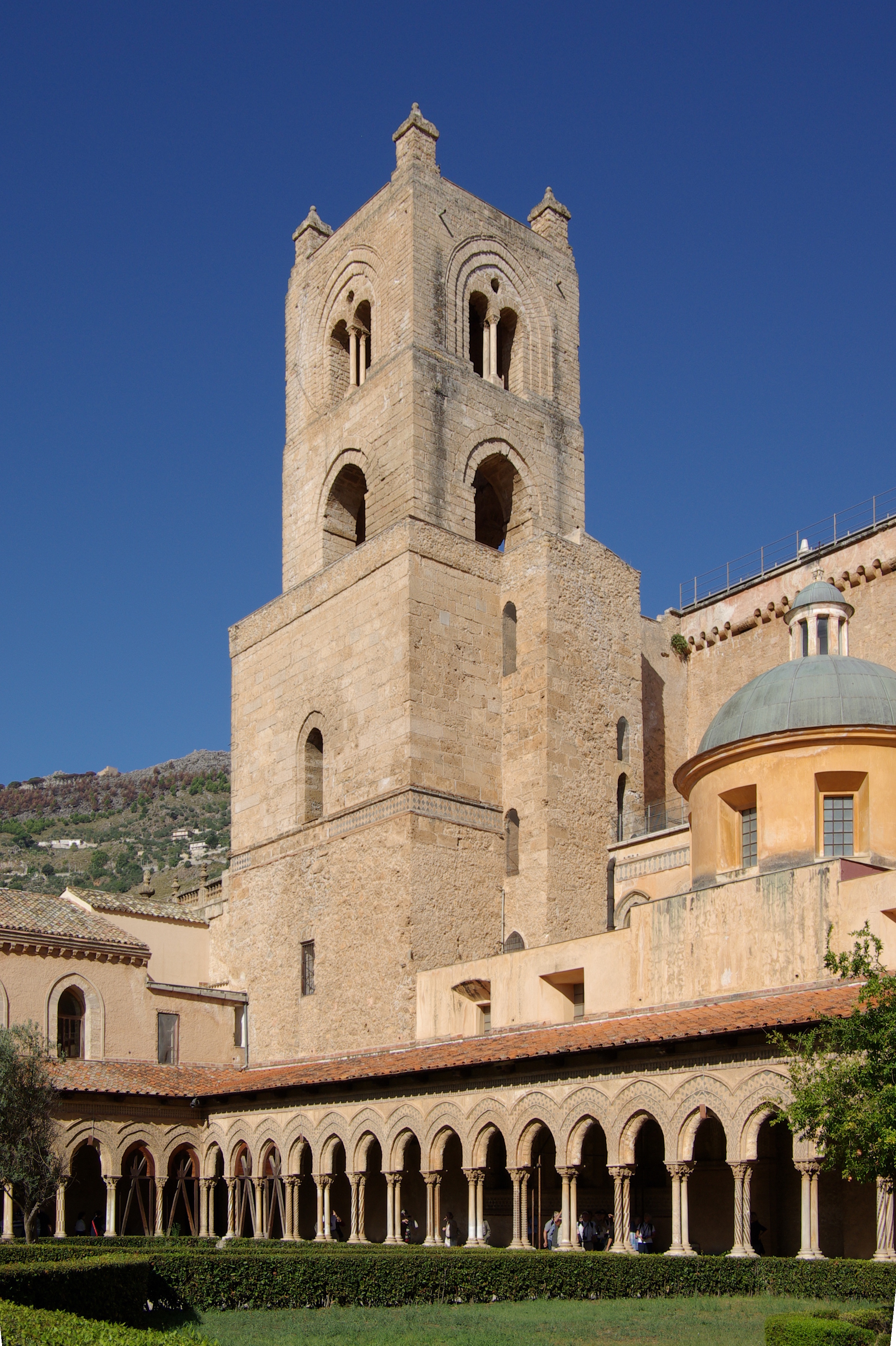
Monreale Cathedral (1183)

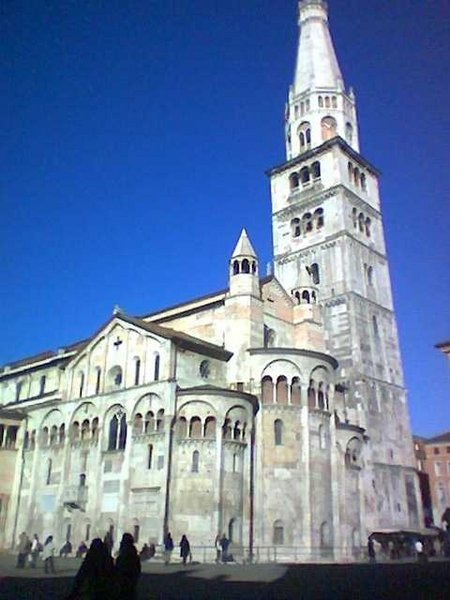
Modena Cathedral (1184)

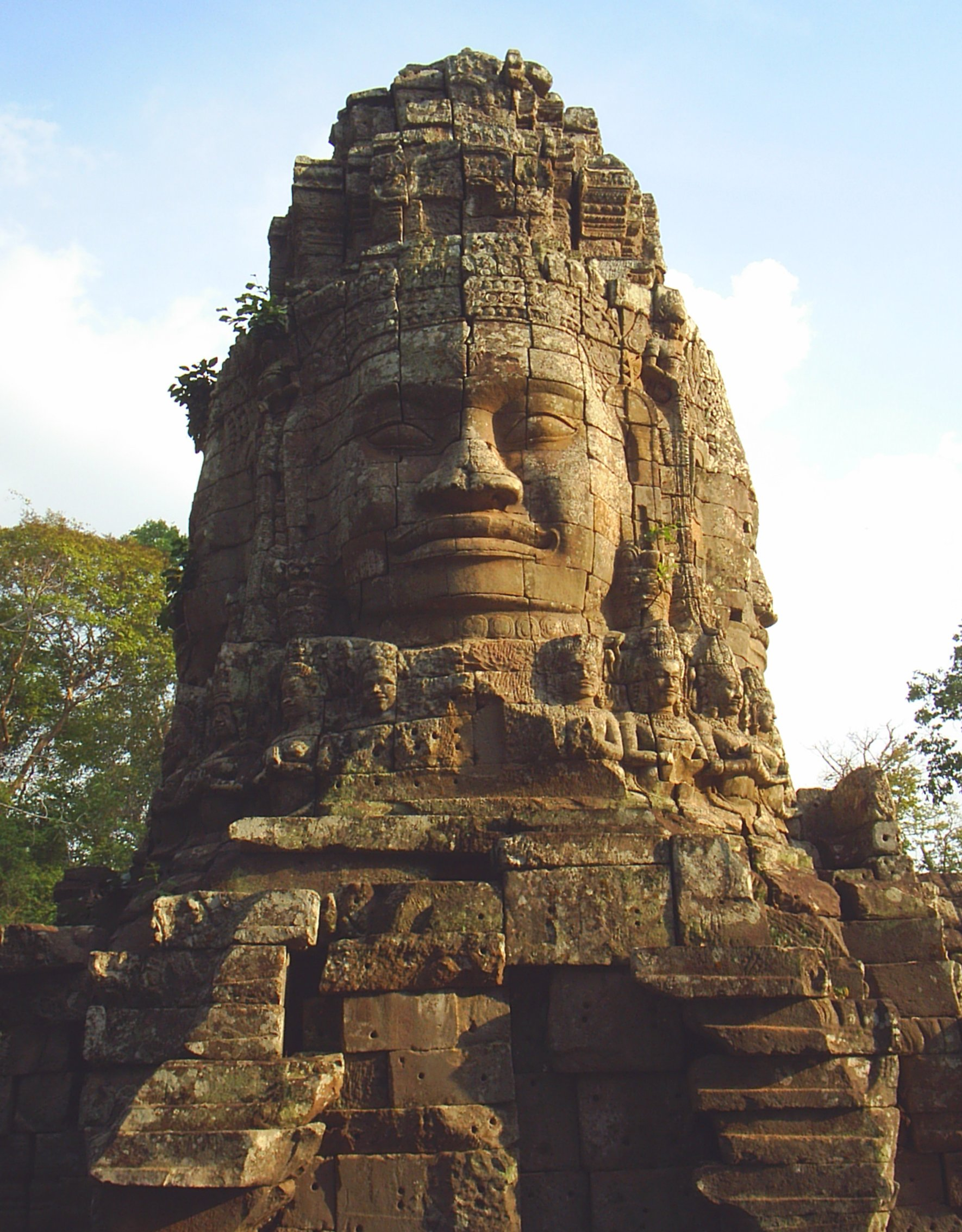
Gopuram at Ta Prohm temple, Angkor (1186)

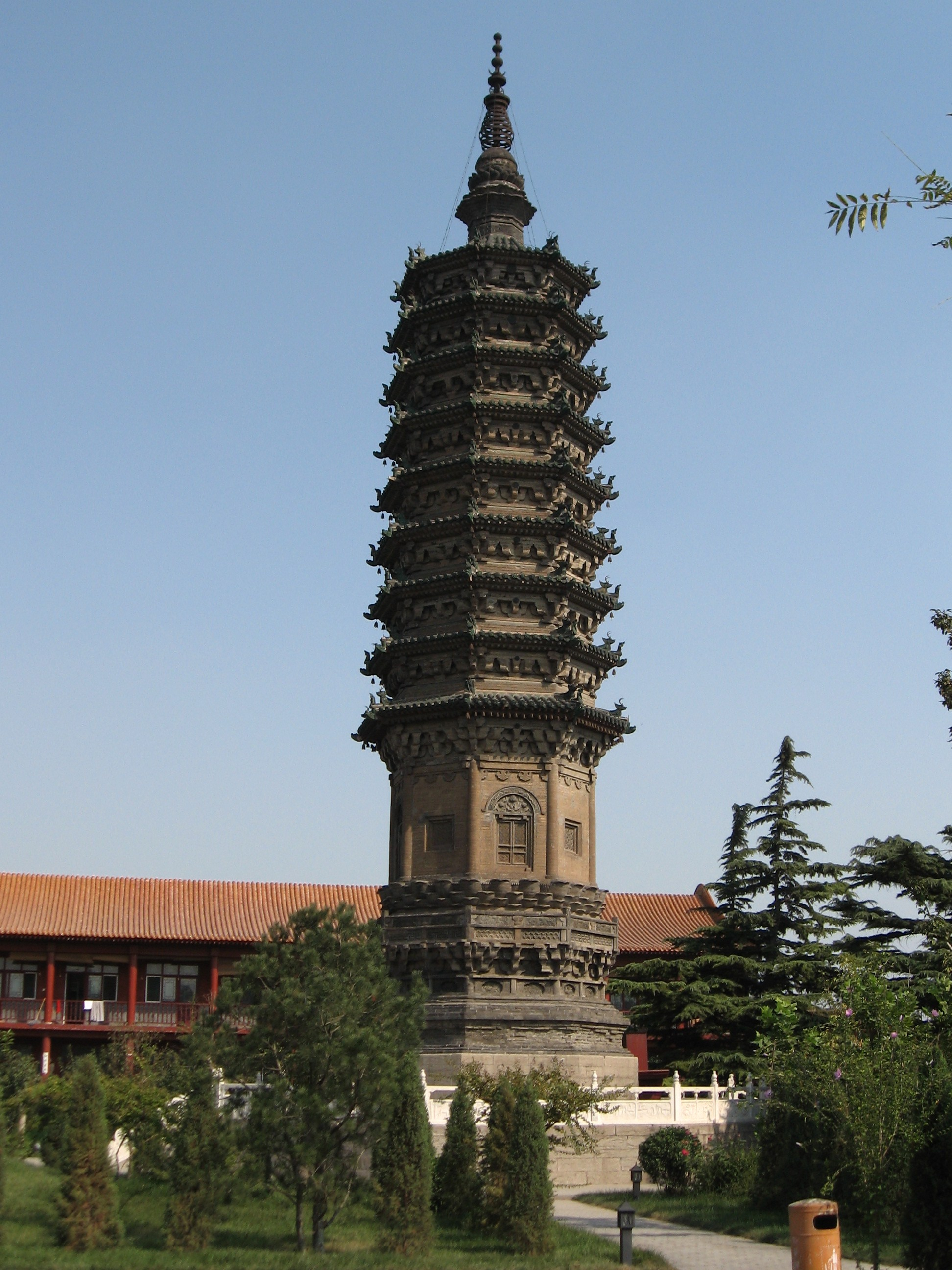
Chengling Pagoda (1189)
