= 1190s in architecture =

- 1180s
- 1190s in architecture
- 1200s

Architecture timeline

== Buildings and structures ==
=== Buildings ===
- From c. 1190 – 'Cliff Palace' in Mesa Verde (modern-day Colorado) constructed by Ancestral Puebloans of the Pueblo III Era.
- 1191 – St. Gereon's Basilica in Cologne, Holy Roman Empire, consecrated.
- 1191 – Preah Khan Baray built in Angkor, Khmer Empire.
- 1192 – Torpo Stave Church, Norway, built.
- 1192 – Rebuilding of Lincoln Cathedral begun.
- c. 1192 – Qutb Minar (minaret), Delhi, India.
- 1192–April 1199 – Adhai Din Ka Jhonpra mosque in Ajmer, Rajasthan, rebuilt from a Sanskrit college.
- 1193 – Construction of the Quwwat-ul-Islam Mosque begun in the Delhi Sultanate.
- c. 1194 – Minaret of Jam, probably at Firozkoh, Ghor (modern-day Afghanistan) built.
- 1194 – Rebuilding of Chartres Cathedral begun.
- 1195 – Rebuilding of Bourges Cathedral begun.
- c. 1195 – Theotokos Kyriotissa Church built in Constantinople.
- 1196 – Baptistery of Parma constructed.
- 1196 – Minaret of the Koutoubia Mosque completed in Marrakesh, Almohad Morocco.
- 1196–1198 – Château Gaillard built in Normandy.
- 1197 – San Nicola di Bari, in the Kingdom of Sicily completed (begun in 1084).
- 1197 – St. Mungo's Cathedral, Glasgow, Scotland consecrated.
- 1197 – West Front of the Ely Cathedral finished (begun in 1174).
- 1198 – Dhammayazika Pagoda built in Bagan, Pagan Kingdom (begun in 1196).
- 1199 – St Laurence's Church, Ludlow, in England rebuilt.
- Exact date not specified
  - Arabic Baths, Girona, Catalonia constructed.
  - Neak Pean temple built on an island in the middle of Preah Khan Baray in Angkor.
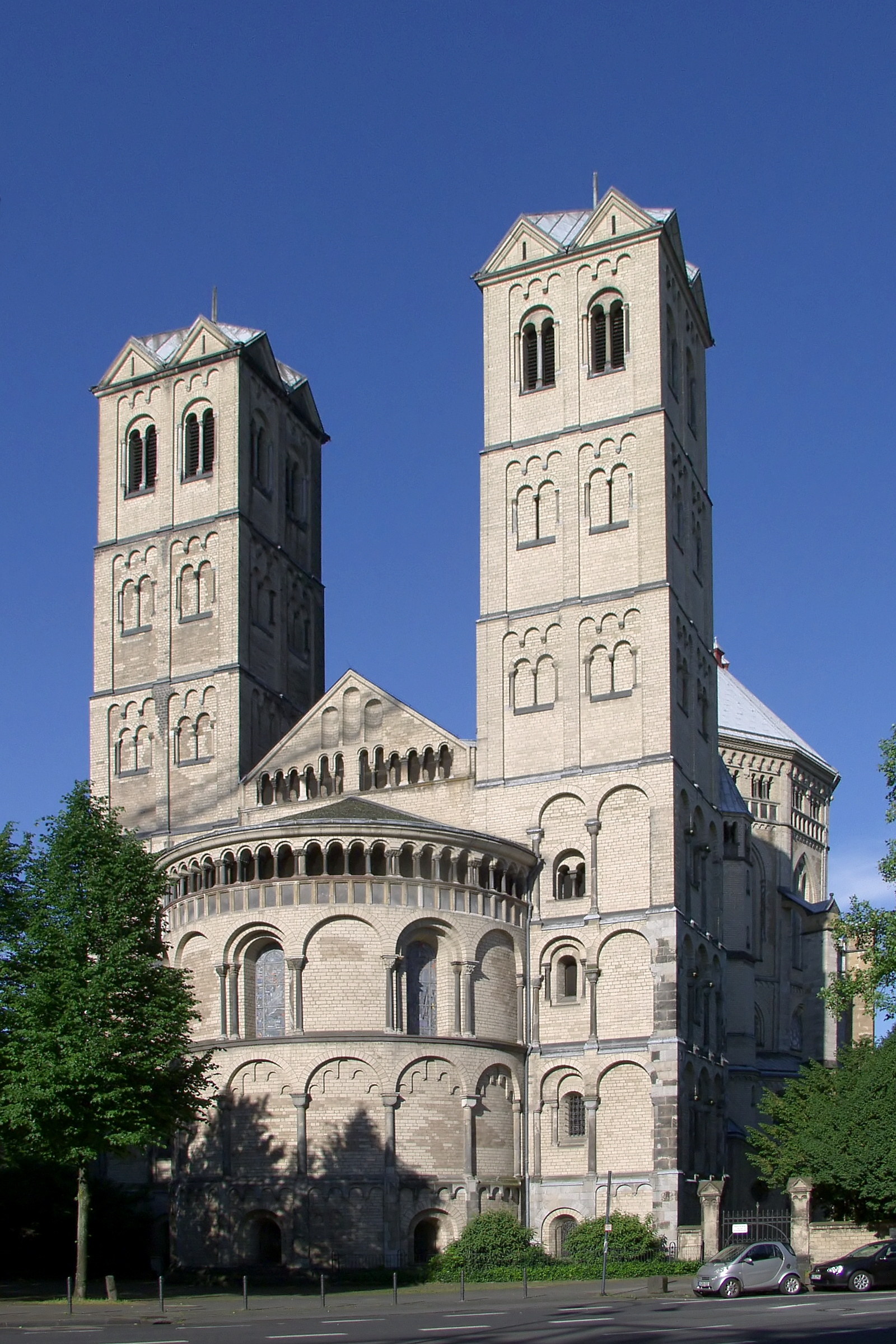
St. Gereon's Basilica, Cologne (1191)

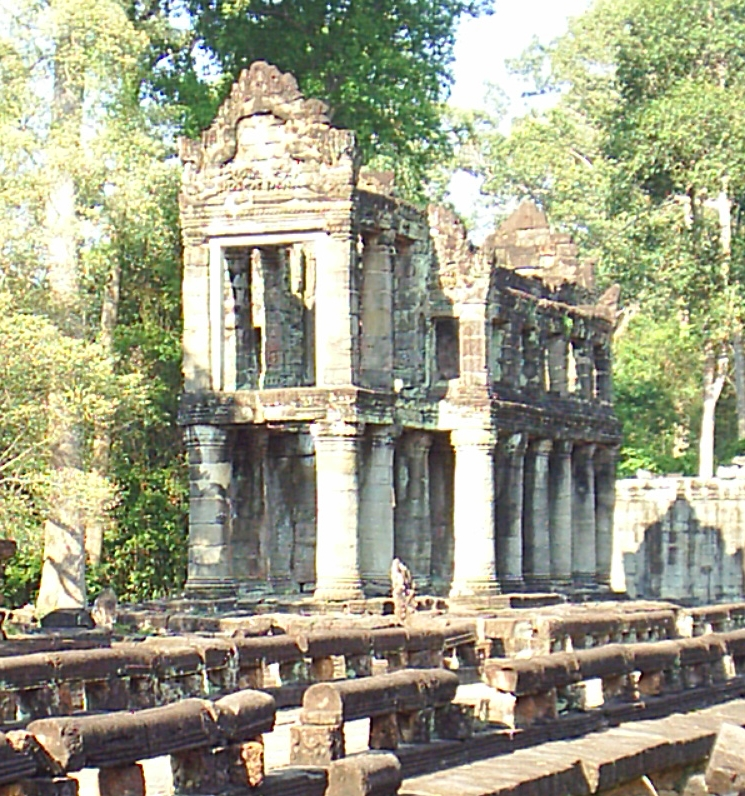
Building around Preah Khan, Angkor (1191)

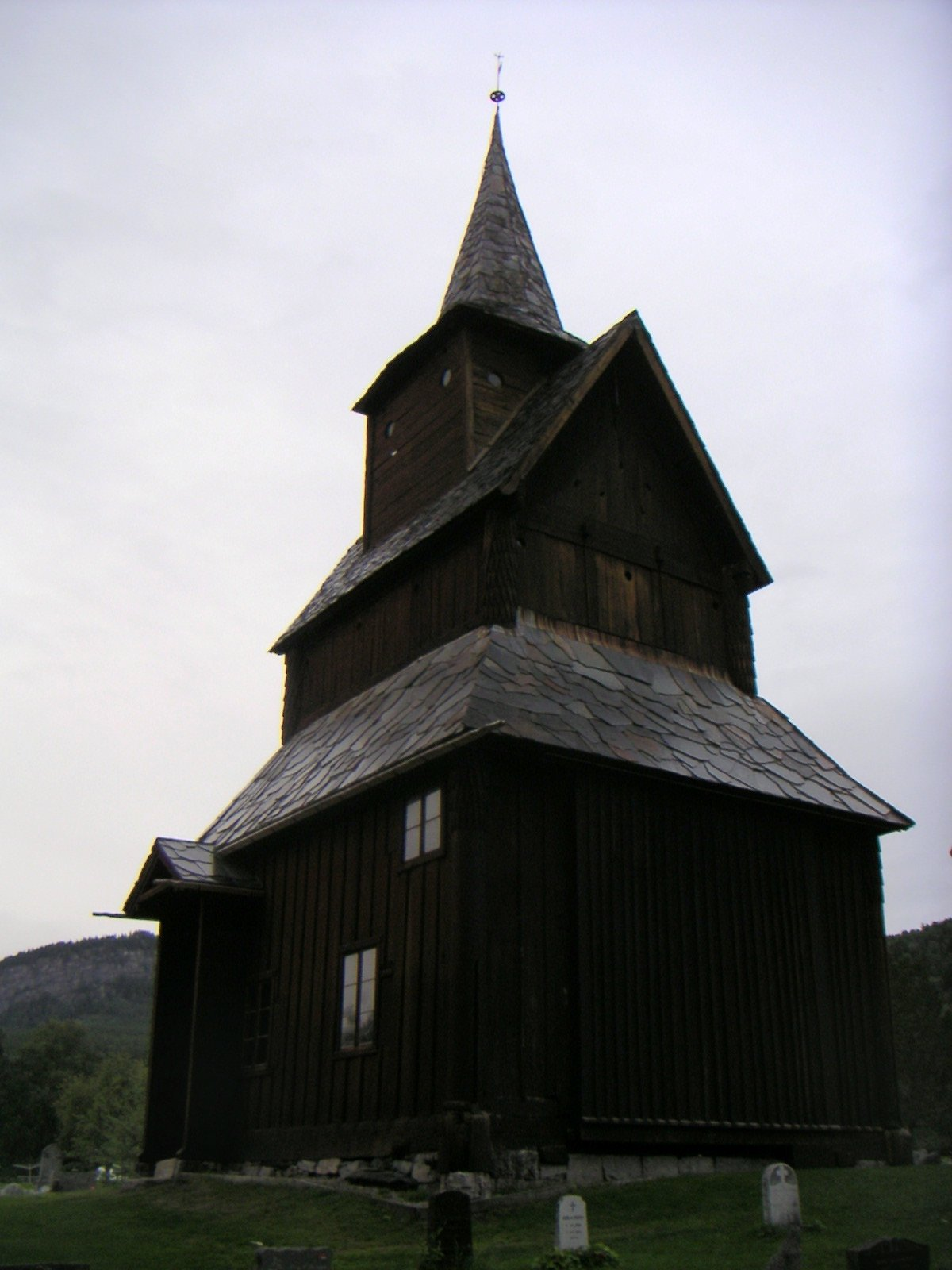
Torpo stave church (1192)

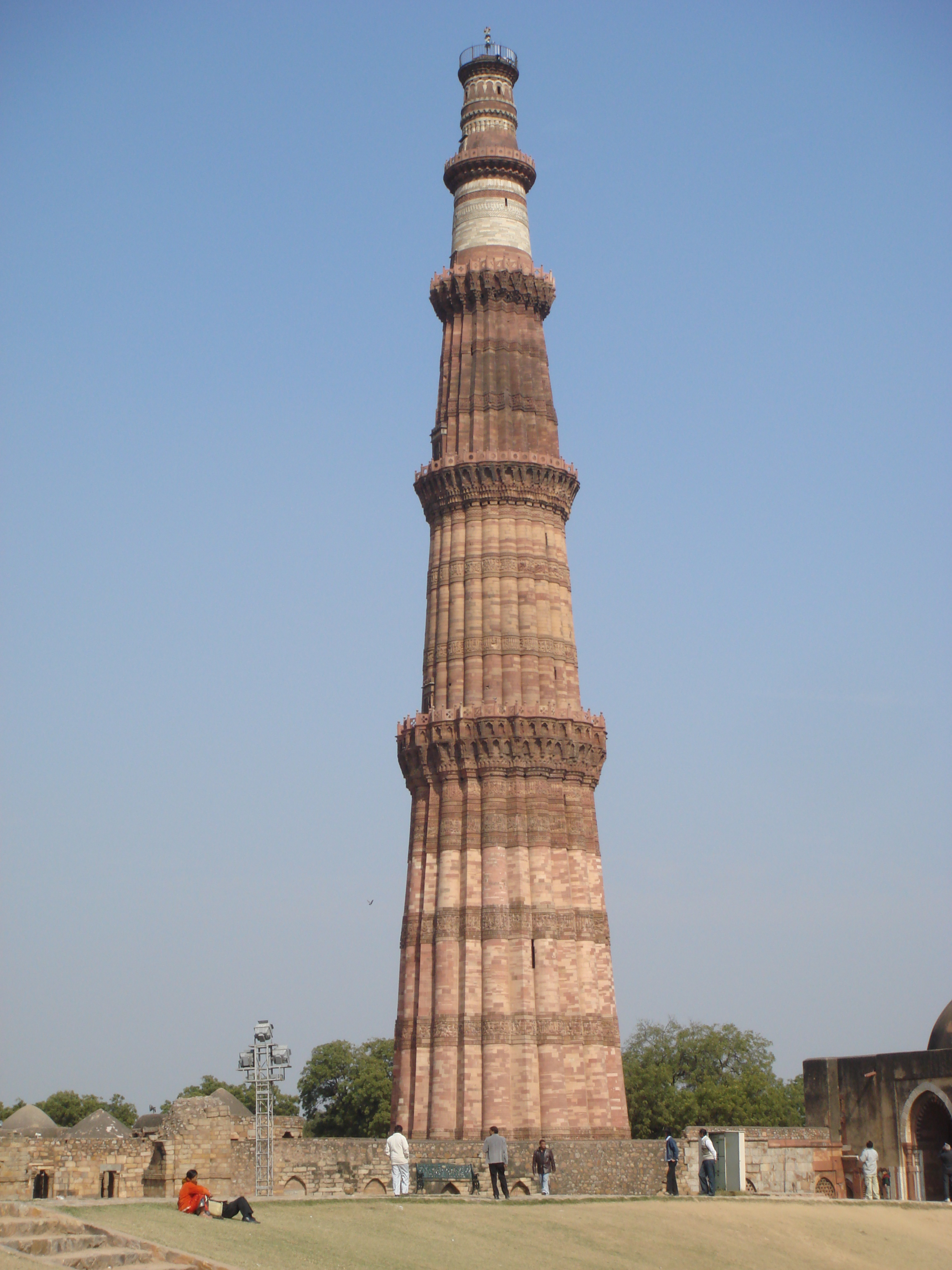
Qutb Minar, Delhi (c. 1192)

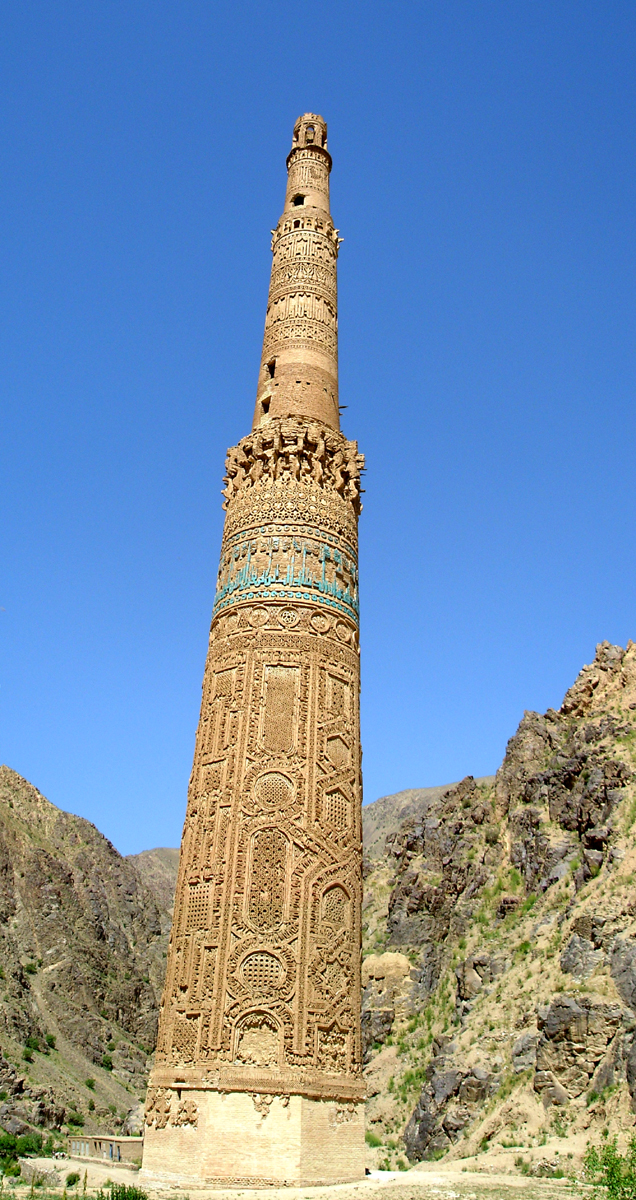
Minaret of Jam (c. 1194)

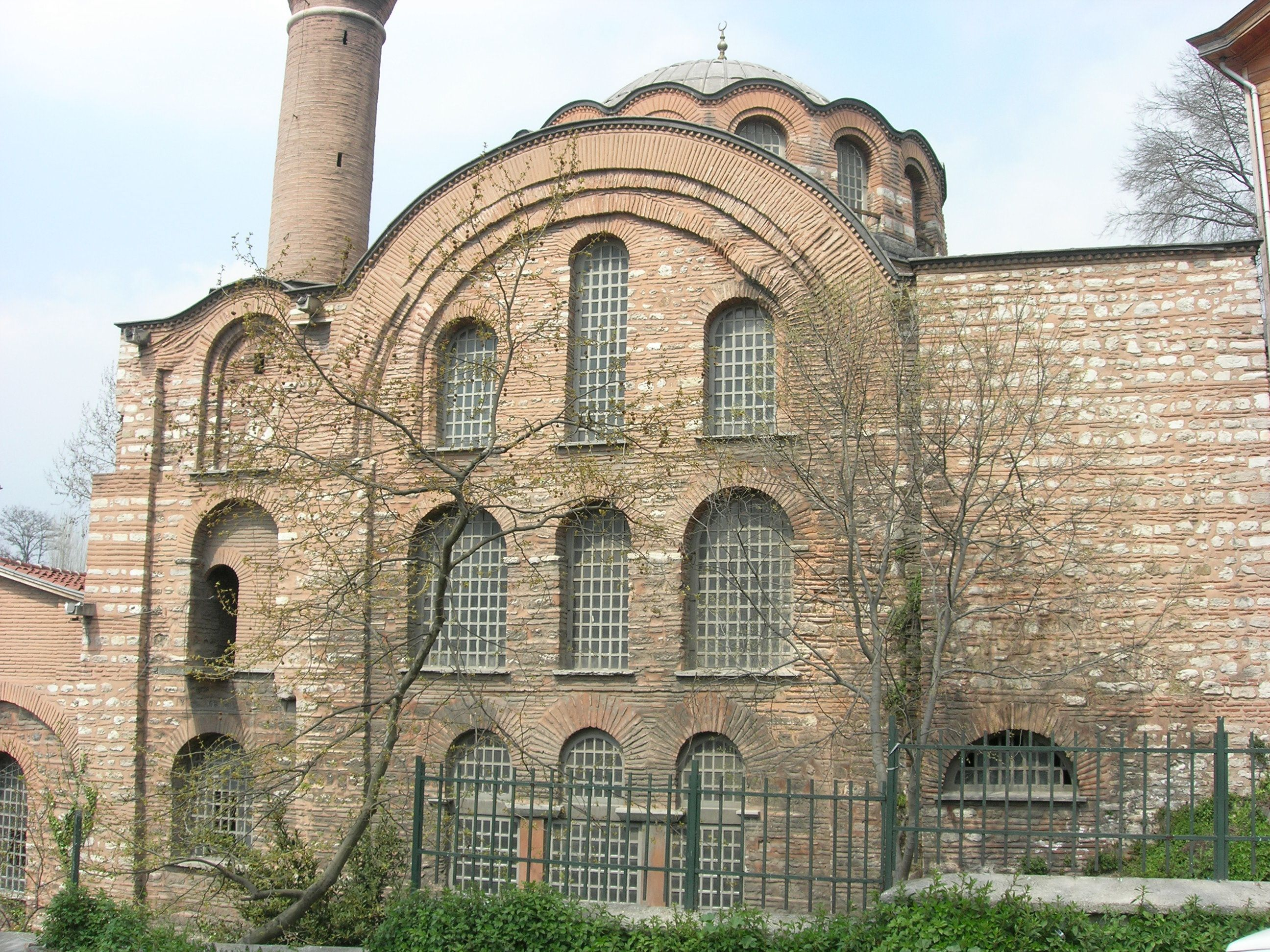
Theotokos Kyriotissa Church, Constantinople (c. 1195)

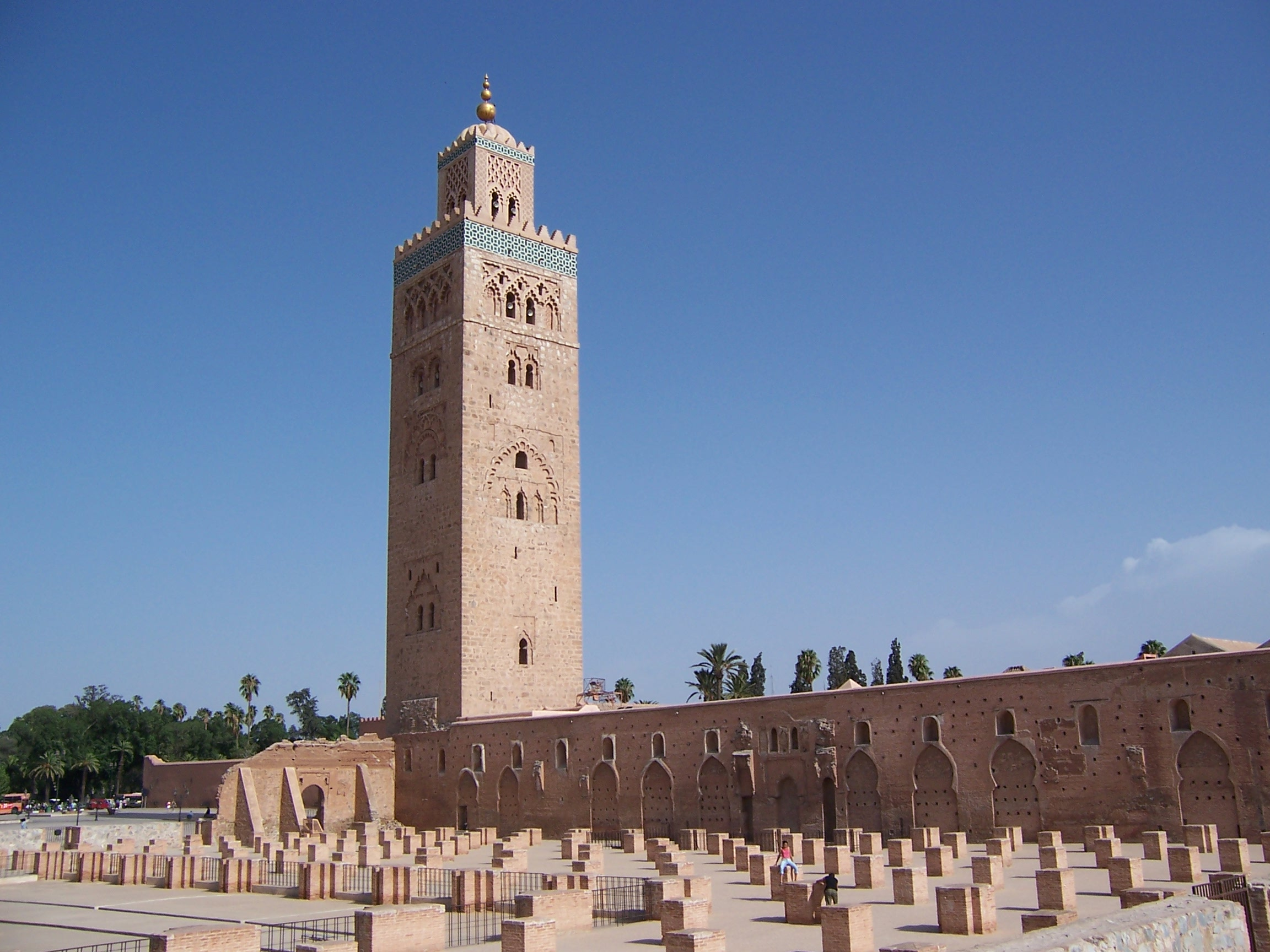
Koutoubia Mosque minaret, Marrakesh (1196)

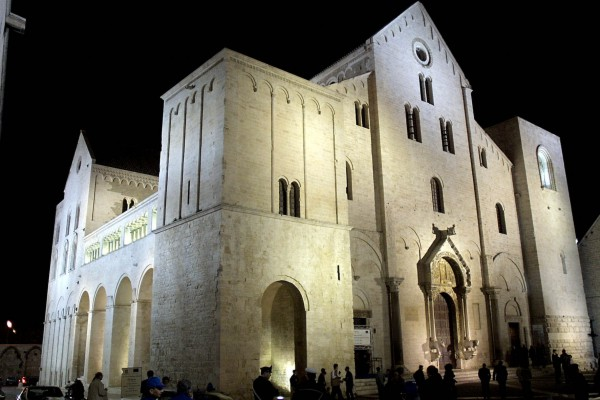
San Nicola, Bari (1197)

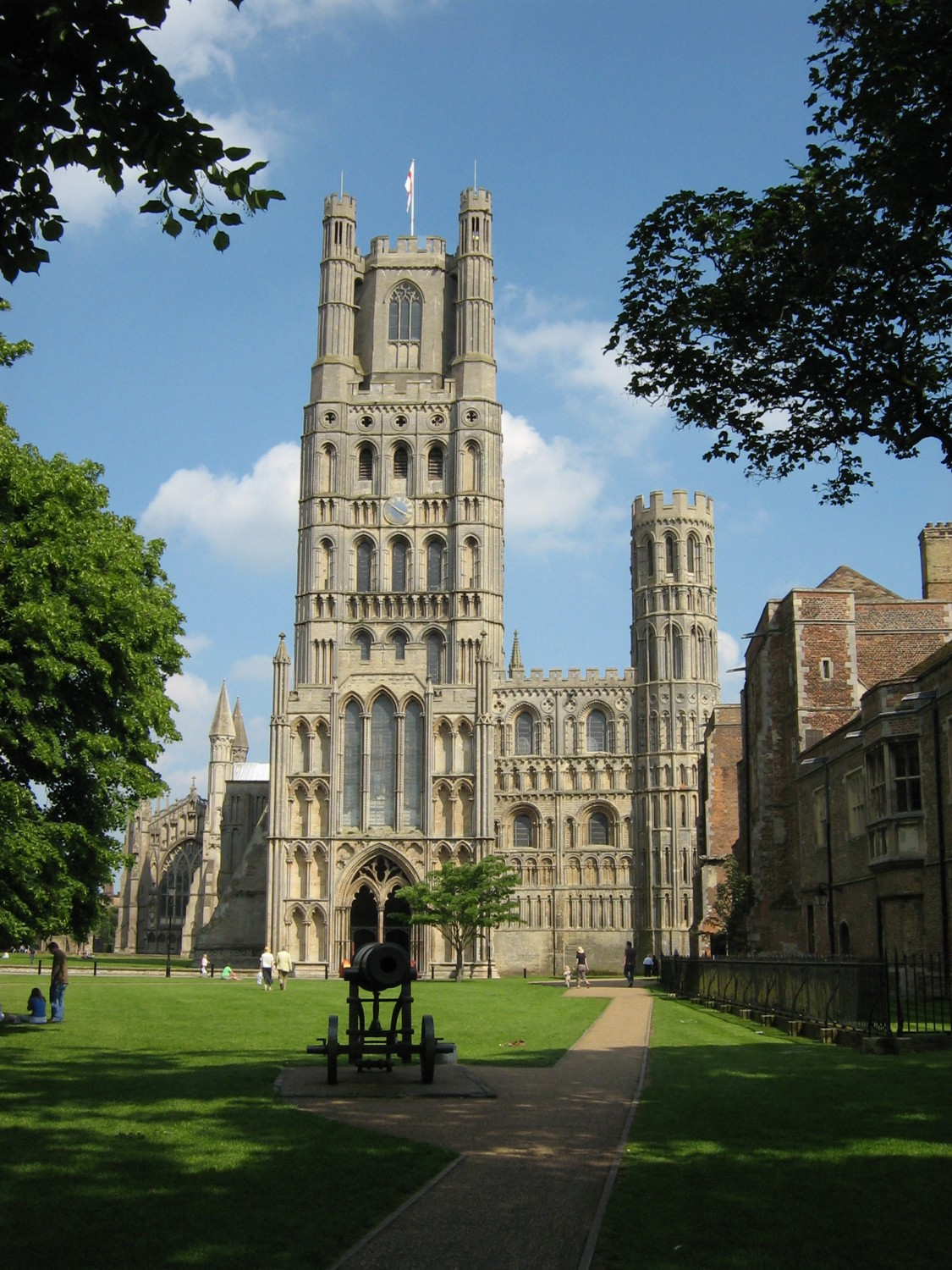
Ely Cathedral West Front (1197)

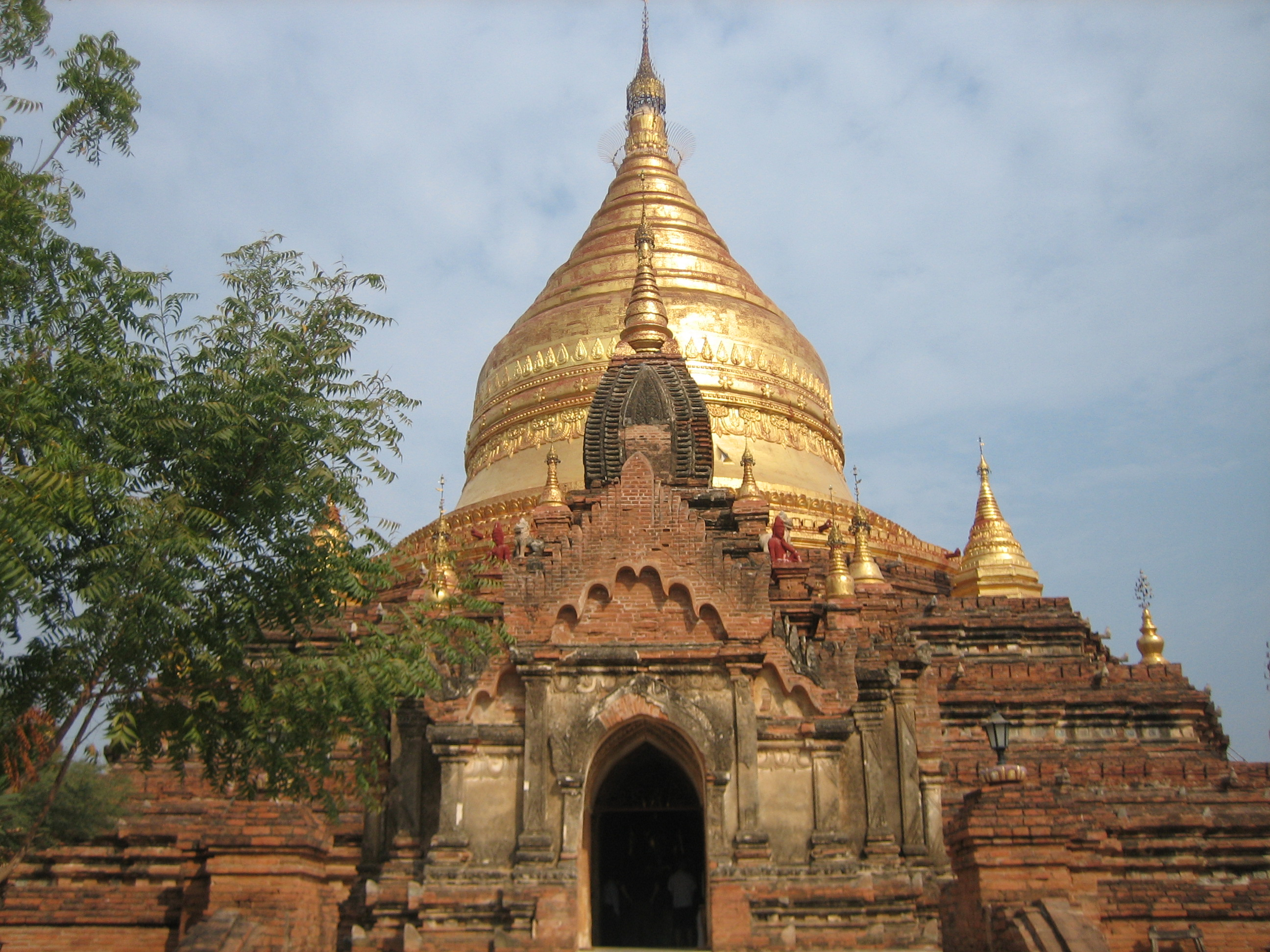
Dhammayazika Pagoda, Bagan (1198)

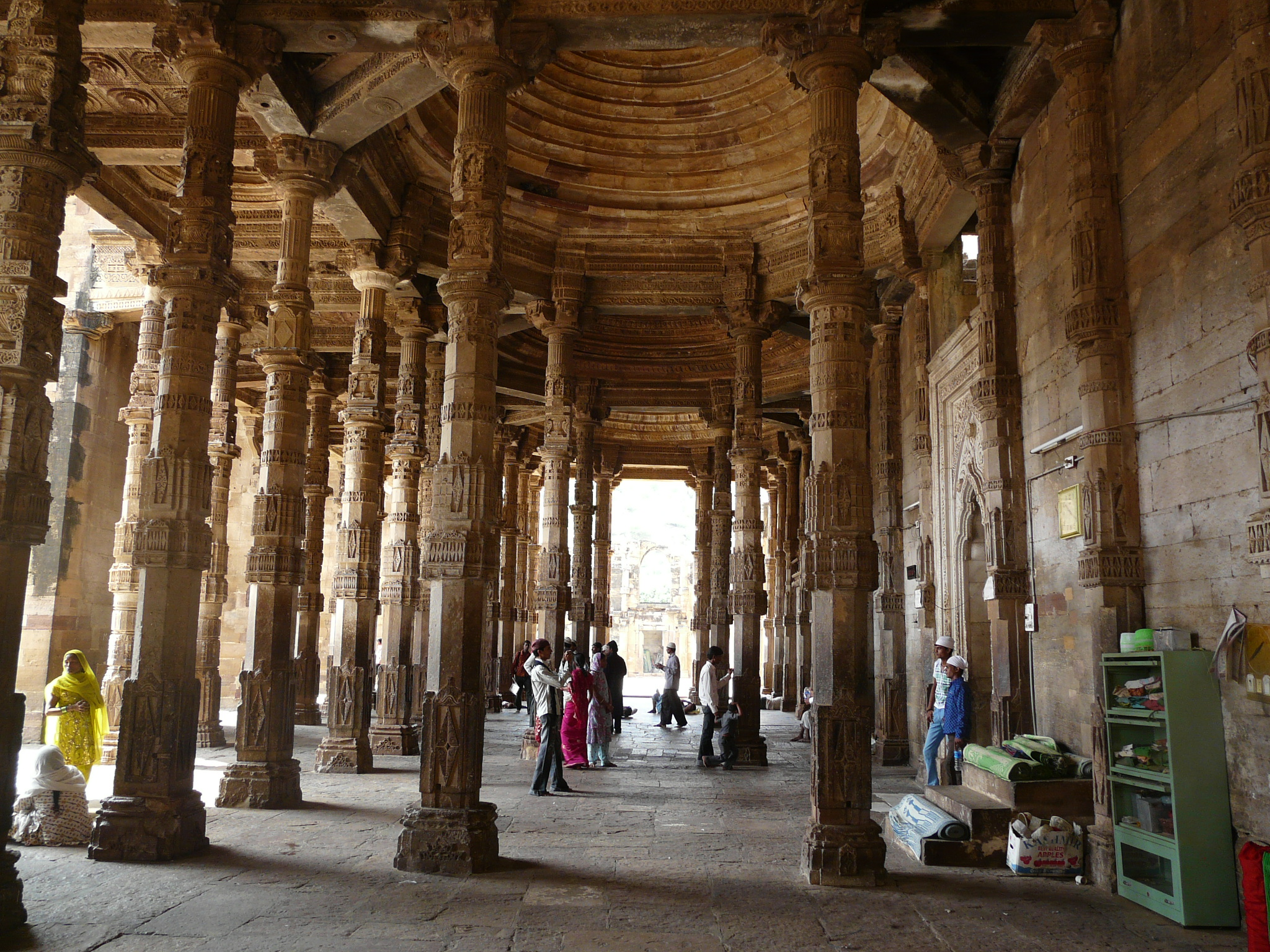
Adhai Din Ka Jhonpra (1199)

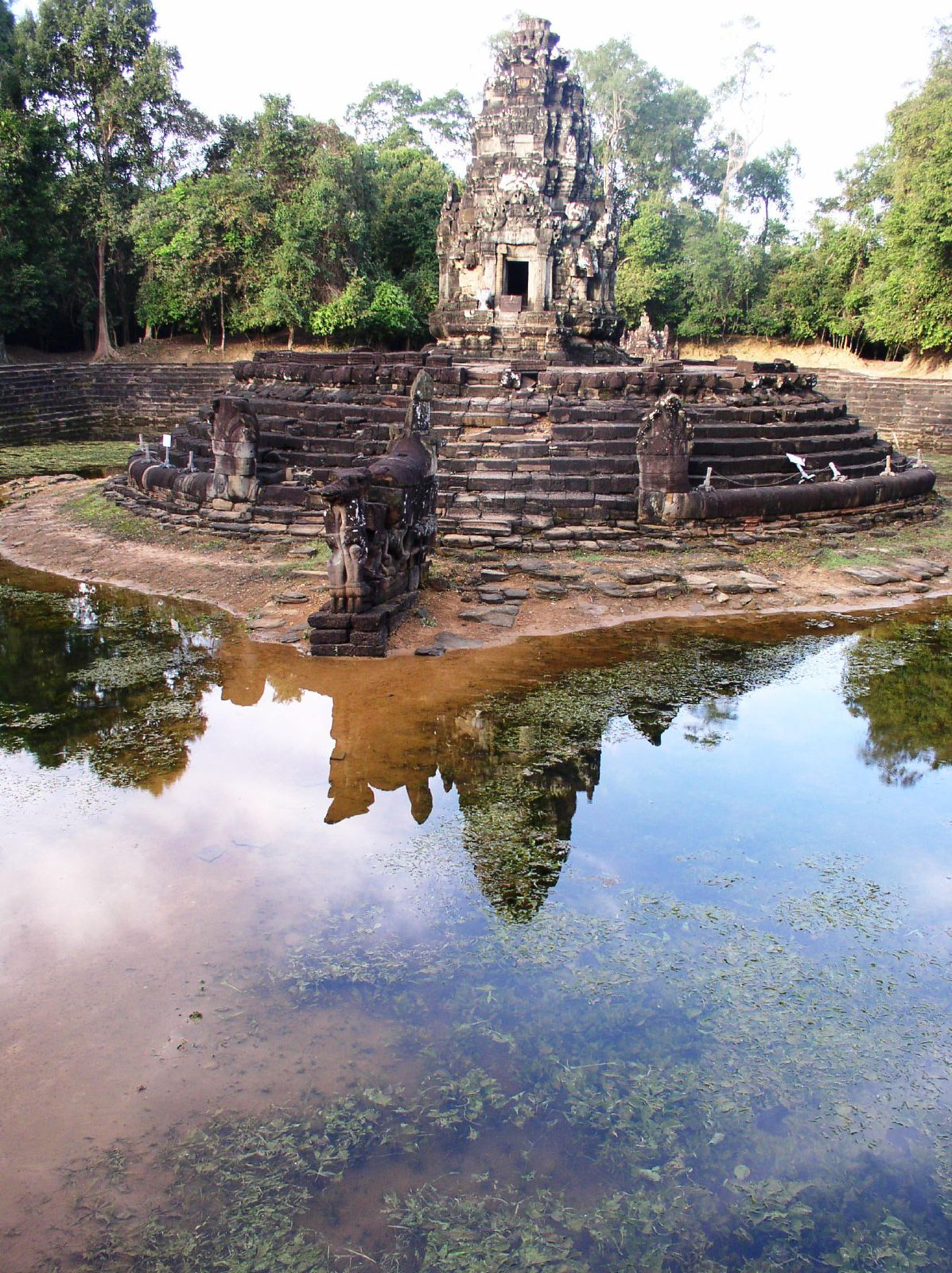
Neak Pean, Angkor
