= Färlöv =

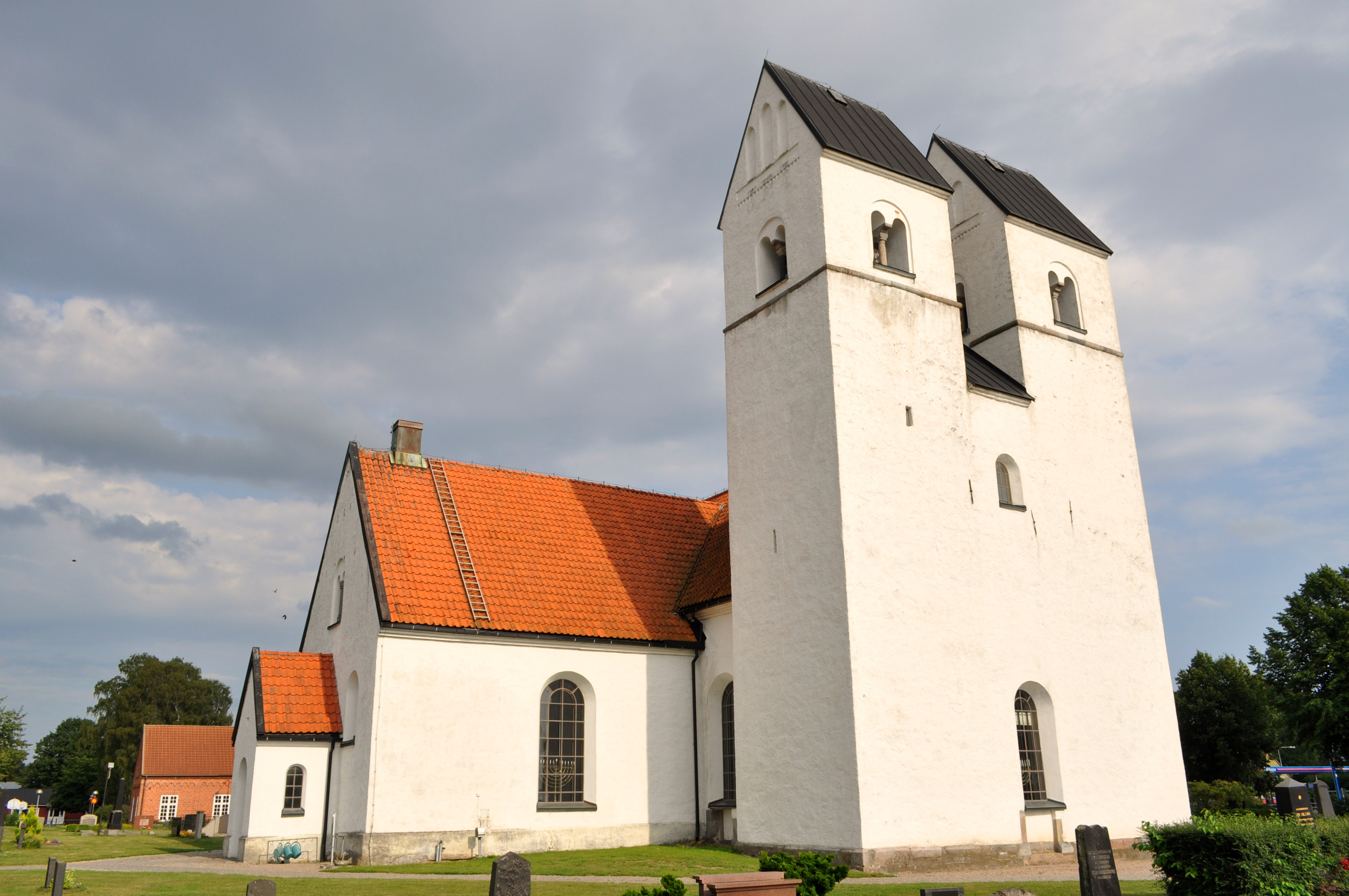
- Färlöv Church

- Location within Skåne Location within Sweden
- Coordinates: 56°04′N 14°05′E
- Country: Sweden
- Province: Skåne
- County: Skåne County
- Municipality: Kristianstad Municipality

Area
  - Total: 0.92 km^{2} (0.36 sq mi)

Population (31 December 2010)
  - Total: 1,026
  - Density: 1,121/km^{2} (2,900/sq mi)
- Time zone: UTC+1 (CET)
  - Summer (DST): UTC+2 (CEST)

Färlöv is a locality situated in Kristianstad Municipality, Skåne County, Sweden with 1,026 inhabitants in 2010.

Färlöv is best known for Färlöv Church, a Romanesque 12th century church with twin towers.

Being a small town, Färlöv does not have much more than a church, a kindergarten, an elementary school, a filling station/convenience store, and a pizza restaurant. The rest of the town is made up of dwellings for people who work in Kristianstad.
