= Porsuk, Çarşamba =

Village in Samsun Province, Turkey

Porsuk
- Neighbourhood
- Location in Turkey
- Coordinates: 41°07′N 36°39′E
- Country: Turkey
- Province: Samsun
- District: Çarşamba
- Population (2022): 781
- Time zone: UTC+3 (TRT)

Porsuk is a neighbourhood of the municipality and district of Çarşamba, Samsun Province, Turkey. Its population is 781 (2022).
