= 1210s in architecture =

- 1200s
- 1210s in architecture
- 1220s
Other topics in 1210s:
- Art
- Music

Architecture timeline

== Events ==
- 1210 – Rebuilding of Coutances Cathedral, in France, in its current gothic aspect begins after the destruction of the previous romanesque building in a fire.

== Buildings and structures ==
=== Buildings ===
- 1211
  - Santiago de Compostela Cathedral in Galicia (Spain) (begun in the 11th century) completed and consecrated.
  - Restoration of Reims Cathedral to its current aspect begun.
- 1213
  - Screen wall at Adhai Din Ka Jhonpra mosque in Ajmer, Rajasthan.
  - Guyue Bridge in China built.
- 1214 – Holy Cross Church, Lehre in Lower Saxony completed in its original form about this date.
- 1218 – Htilominlo Temple built in Bagan, Pagan Kingdom (begun in 1211).
- 1219 – Toompea Castle begun in Tallinn.
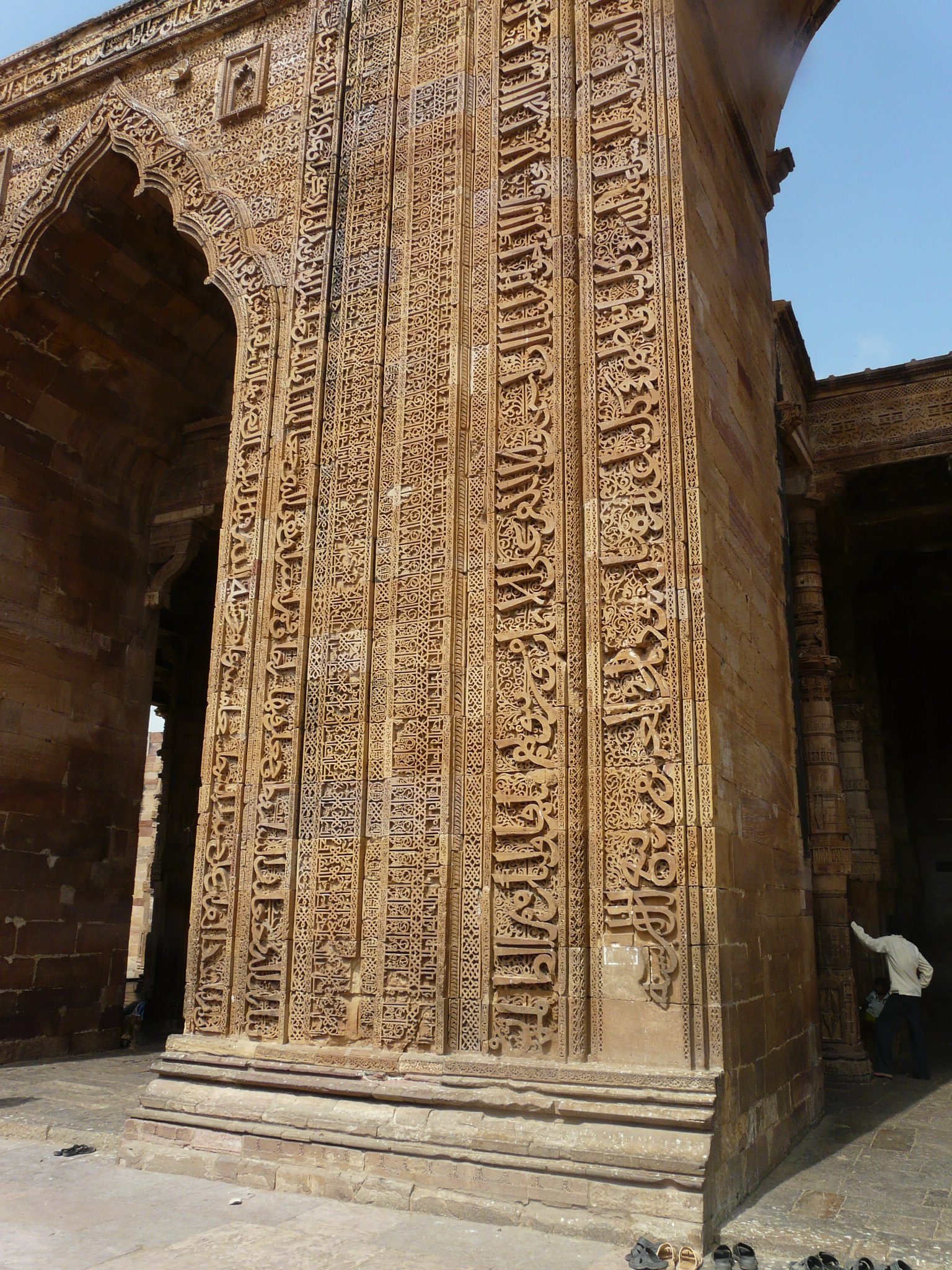
Screen wall, Adhai Din Ka Jhonpra (1213)

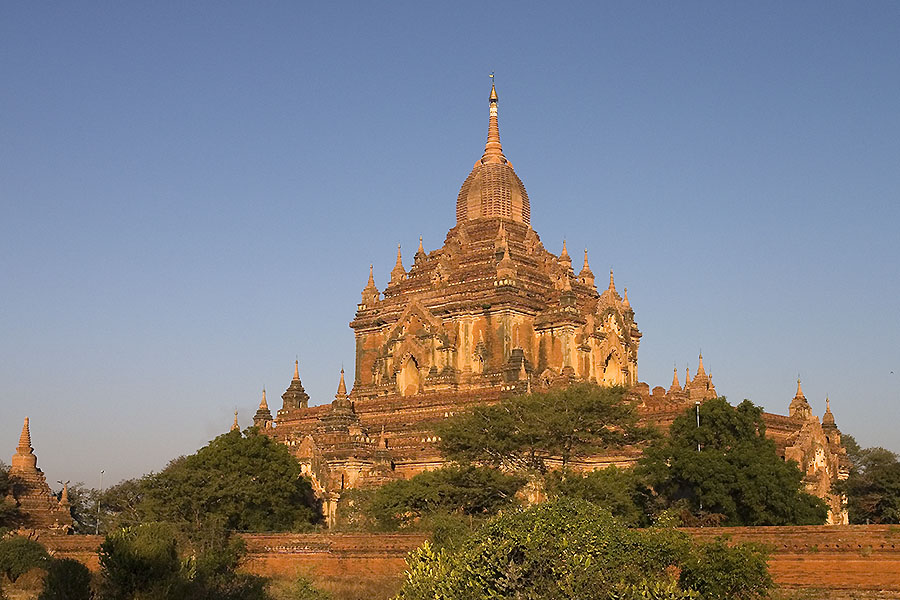
Htilominlo Temple (1218)
