= Dhammayazika Pagoda =

Buddhist Pagoda in Bagan, Myanmar

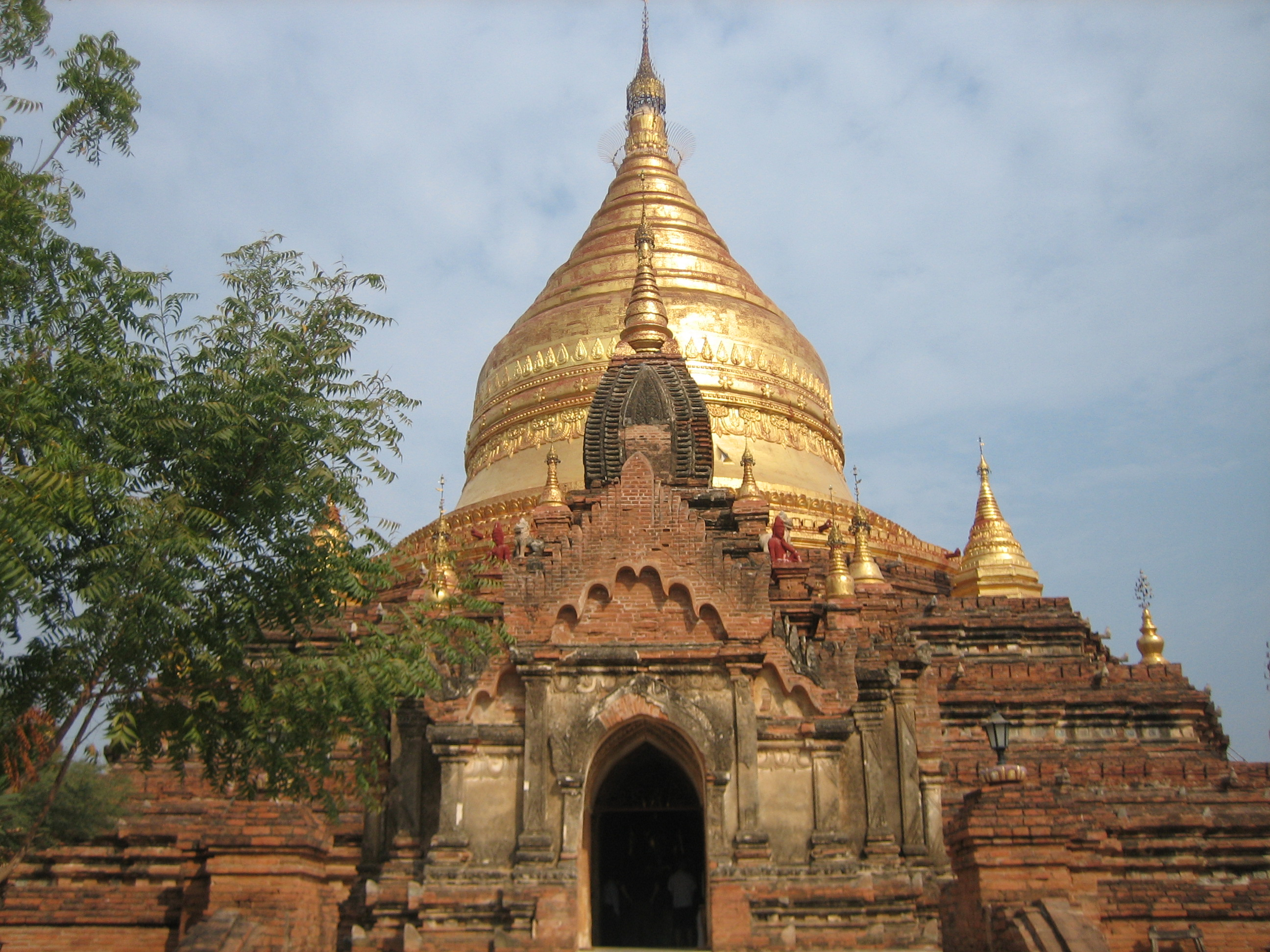

- Location within Myanmar

Religion
- Affiliation: Theravada Buddhism

Location
- Location: Pwasaw village, Mandalay Region
- Country: Myanmar
- Coordinates: 21.145071°N 94.883451°E

Architecture
- Completed: 1196; 830 years ago

The Dhammayazika Pagoda (Burmese: ဓမ္မရာဇိကဘုရား, IPA: [dəma̰jàzḭka̰ pʰəjá]) is a Buddhist temple located in the village of Pwasaw (located east of Bagan), in Mandalay Region, Myanmar. It was built in 1196 during the reign of King Narapatisithu. The pagoda is circular in design, and is made of brick. Its three terraces contain terra cotta tiles illustrating scenes from the Jataka.

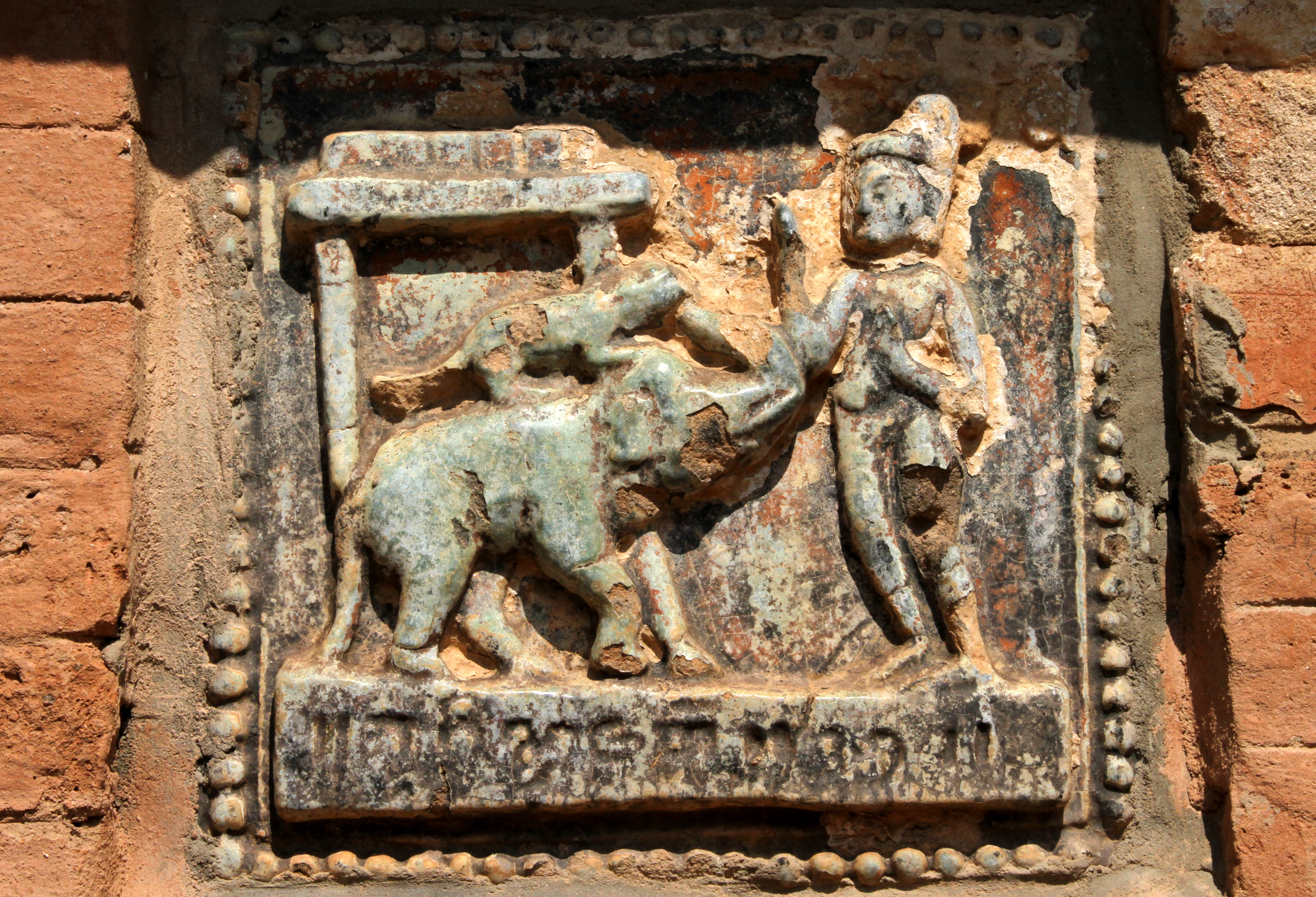
Jataka terra cotta

The Dhammayazika Pagoda is the oldest known building to display C5 symmetry, with rotational symmetry around five points. The center is a circular building surrounded by walls in a pentagonal shape, with each flat edge having a pointed building attached outwards. This design allows for five shrines instead of the typical four found in traditional Buddhist temples. The fifth shrine is dedicated to the future Buddha, Maitreya, who symbolizes awaiting rebirth.
