= Göğceli Mosque =

Mosque in Çarşamba, Samsun, Turkey

- Göğceli Camii
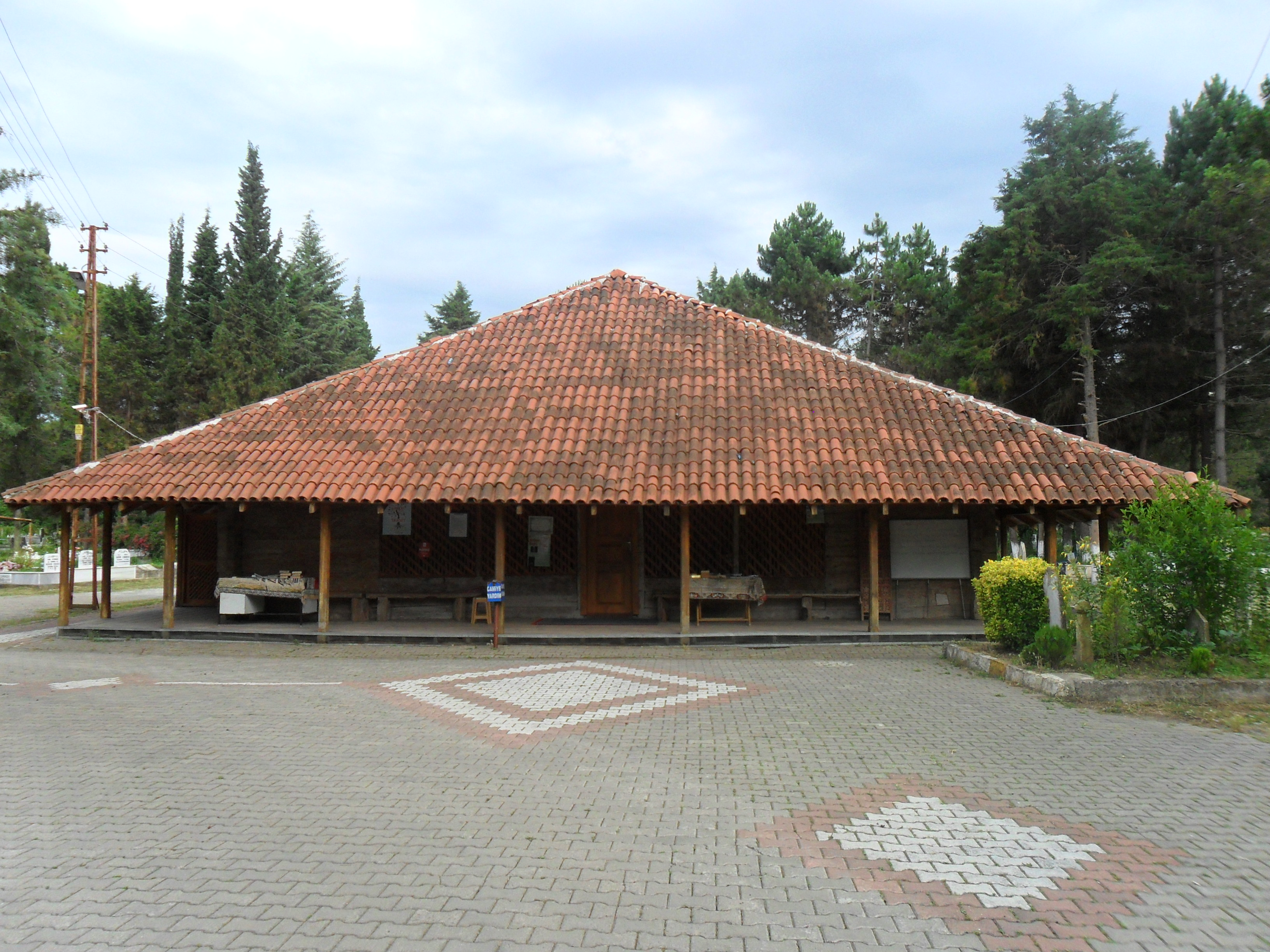
- Göğceli Mosque

- Location of the mosque in Turkey

Religion
- Affiliation: Sunni
- District: Çarşamba
- Province: Samsun
- Region: Black Sea
- Status: active

Location
- Location: Hasbahçe Mah.
- Country: Turkey
- Interactive map of Göğceli Mosque
- Coordinates: 41.1981°N 36.7432°E

Architecture
- Type: Mosque
- Style: Seljuk
- Completed: 1206; 820 years ago

Specifications
- Capacity: 300
- Length: 21.15–22.20 m (69.4–72.8 ft)
- Width: 17.50–17.75 m (57.4–58.2 ft)
- Materials: Wood

Göğceli Mosque (Turkish: Göğceli Camii) is a historic log mosque situated inside the Göğceli Cemetery in Çarşamba, Samsun, northern Turkey. Built during the Seljuk Empire period in the 13th century, the log mosque was constructed without the use of nails.

== Mosque building ==
Göğceli Mosque is situated inside the cemetery of the same name at Hasbahçe neighborhood in the Çarşamba district of Samsun Province. According to a research carried out on the wood samples taken from the building in 1990, it was built during the second reign of Seljuk Sultan of Rûm Kaykhusraw I (r. 1205–1211) in 1206. In 1335, the portico underwent a restoration. The single-storey mosque was constructed forming the walls with single-piece planks stacked without the use of nails. The wall planks are interlocked at edges by double-notch joint technique. Woods of elm, ash tree and chestnut were used on walls, columns, column capitals, joists, rafters and ridge-post framing. The planks of the walls are 15–18 cm (5.9–7.1 in) thick, 50–70 cm (20–28 in) wide and around 12.60 and 20 m (41.3 and 65.6 ft) long. The building measures 17.50–17.75 m (57.4–58.2 ft) × 21.15–22.20 m (69.4–72.8 ft) from the outside. It is 60–70 cm (24–28 in) high above the ground. The opening under the elevated floor enables ventilation and prevents moisture and decay of the structure. Thanks to the wedges under the building on the ground, it has survived earthquakes. The wooden structure can be completely moved from its place to another. The mosque underwent an extensive restoration in 2007.

== Interior ==
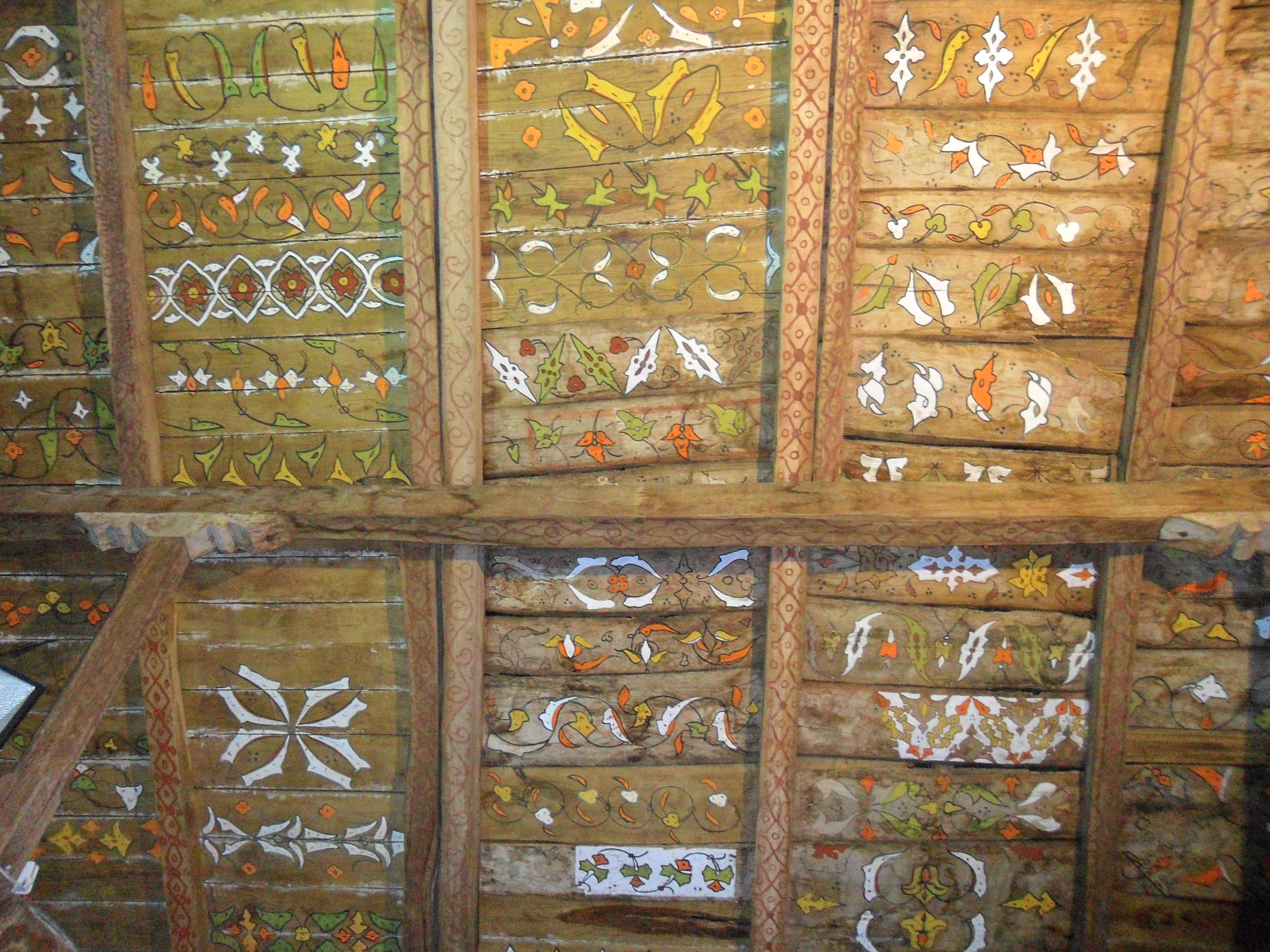
Ceiling detail of the mosque.

The building's covered area is 254 m^{2} (2,730 sq ft). Forged iron nails were used only in the connection of the column capitals to the beams and in the additions made to the rafters extending towards the portico sections for women. The roof, the northern part of which is slightly curved, is a three-shouldered roof. The roof is carried by wooden walls and struts. The roof of the women's section is supported by six columns. The ornaments, dated to early and classical Ottoman Empire period, are colored with vegetal paint. The mosque, still in use, has a capacity for 300 people.

The cemetery around the mosque is known as the cemetery of strangers.
