= Kumarli, Iran =

Town in Tehran province, Iran

Kumarli
- Location in Iran
- Coordinates: 36°23′0″N 49°28′0″E
- Country: Iran

Kumarli is a town located in Tehran, Iran.
