= Çarşamba =

- District and municipality
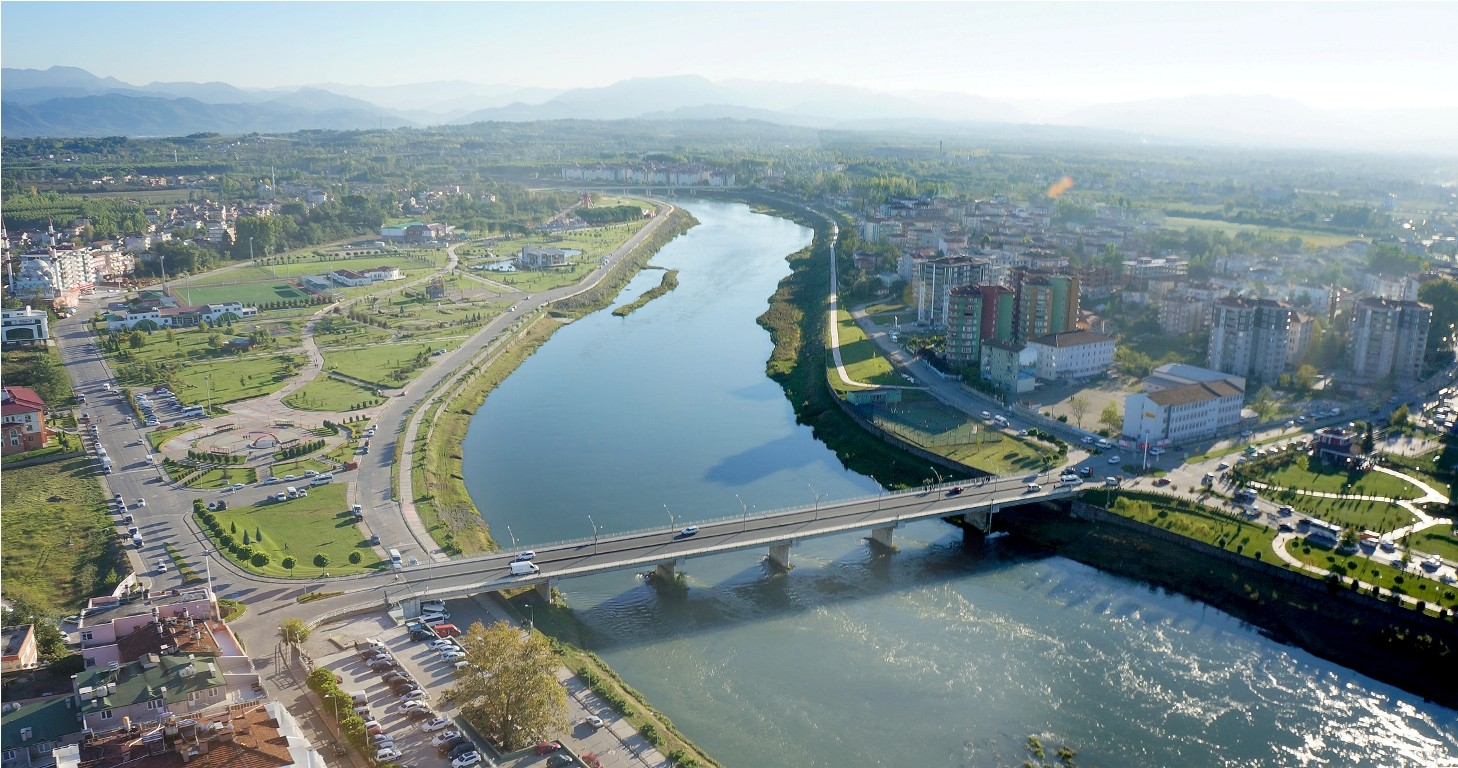

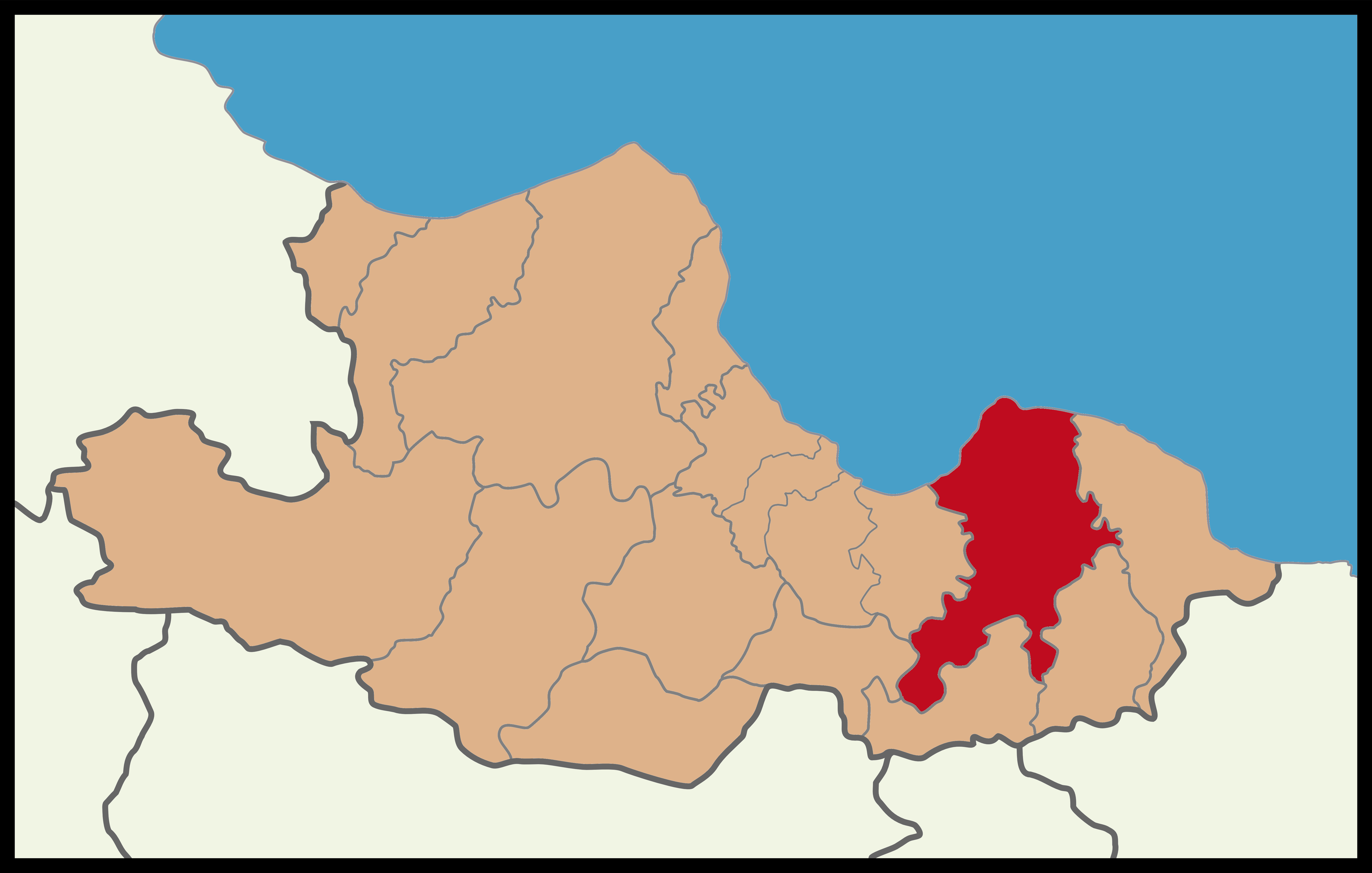
- Map showing Çarşamba District in Samsun Province

- Location within Turkey
- Coordinates: 41°11′57″N 36°43′39″E
- Country: Turkey
- Province: Samsun

Government
  - Mayor: Hüseyin Dündar (Ind.)
- Area: 774 km^{2} (299 sq mi)
- Elevation: 15 m (49 ft)
- Population (2022): 140,664
  - Density: 182/km^{2} (471/sq mi)
- Time zone: UTC+3 (TRT)
- Postal code: 55500
- Area code: 0362
- Climate: Cfa
- Website: www.carsamba.bel.tr

Çarşamba (English: "Wednesday") is a municipality and district of Samsun Province, Turkey. Its area is 774 km^{2}, and its population is 140,664 (2022). It is in the center of the Çarşamba Plain. The mayor is Hüseyin Dündar (Independent). Ferhan Şensoy - writer, actor and stage director - was born here.

The town is bisected by the Yeşilırmak river running south-to-north and by the Black Sea Coastal Road (D010) which runs west-to-east. There is a sugar factory in Çarşamba district.

== Composition ==
There are 143 neighbourhoods in Çarşamba District:

- Acıklı
- Ağcagüney
- Ahubaba
- Akçaltı
- Akçatarla
- Akkuzulu
- Ali Fuat Başgil
- Alibeyli
- Allı
- Arımköseli
- Aşağıdikencik
- Aşağıdonurlu
- Aşağıesenli
- Aşağıkavacık
- Aşağımusalla
- Aşağıturgutlu
- Aşıklı
- Ataköy
- Bafracalı
- Bahçelievler
- Bayramlı
- Beylerce
- Beyyenice
- Bezirgan
- Bölmeçayırı
- Boyacılı
- Çaltı
- Çamlıca
- Canlı
- Çatak
- Çay
- Çayvar
- Çelikli
- Çerçiler
- Çınarlık
- Cumhuriyet
- Dalbahçe
- Damlataş
- Demirarslan
- Demircili
- Demirli
- Denizler
- Deyincek
- Dikbıyık
- Durakbaşı
- Durusu
- Eğercili
- Eğridere
- Eğrikum
- Epçeli
- Esençay
- Esentepe
- Gazi
- Gökçeçakmak
- Gökçeli
- Güldere
- Gülören
- Gülyazı
- Güneşli
- Güzpınar
- Hacılıçay
- Hasbahçe
- Helvacalı
- Hürriyet
- Irmaksırtı
- İstiklal
- Kabaceviz
- Karaağaç
- Karabahçe
- Karacalı
- Karakaya
- Karakulak
- Karamustafalı
- Kaydan
- Kemer
- Kestanepınar
- Kirazbucağı
- Kirazlıkçay
- Kızılot
- Kocakavak
- Köklük
- Koldere
- Konukluk
- Köroğlu
- Kumköy
- Kumtepe
- Kurtahmetli
- Kurtuluş
- Kürtün
- Kuşçulu
- Kuşhane
- Mahmutlu
- Melik
- Musçalı
- Namazlı
- Ömerli
- Ordubaşı
- Orduköy
- Orta
- Otluk
- Ovacık
- Oymalı
- Paşayazı
- Porsuk
- Sahilköy
- Saraçlı
- Sarıcalı
- Sefalı
- Selimiye
- Şenyurt
- Şeyhgüven
- Şeyhhabil
- Sığırtmaç
- Soğucak
- Suğluca
- Sungurlu
- Taşdemir
- Tatarlı
- Tilkili
- Turgutlu
- Üçköprü
- Uluköy
- Ulupınar
- Umut
- Ustacalı
- Uzunlu
- Vakıfköprü
- Yağcılar
- Yalı
- Yamanlı
- Yenikaracalı
- Yenikışla
- Yeniköseli
- Yeşildere
- Yeşilırmak
- Yeşilova
- Yukarı Ağcagüney
- Yukarıdikencik
- Yukarıdonurlu
- Yukarıesenli
- Yukarıkarabahçe
- Yukarıkavacık
- Zümrüt

== See also ==
- Göğceli Mosque, Seljuk Empire era log mosque in Göğceli Cemetery
