= Färlöv Church =

- Färlövs kyrka
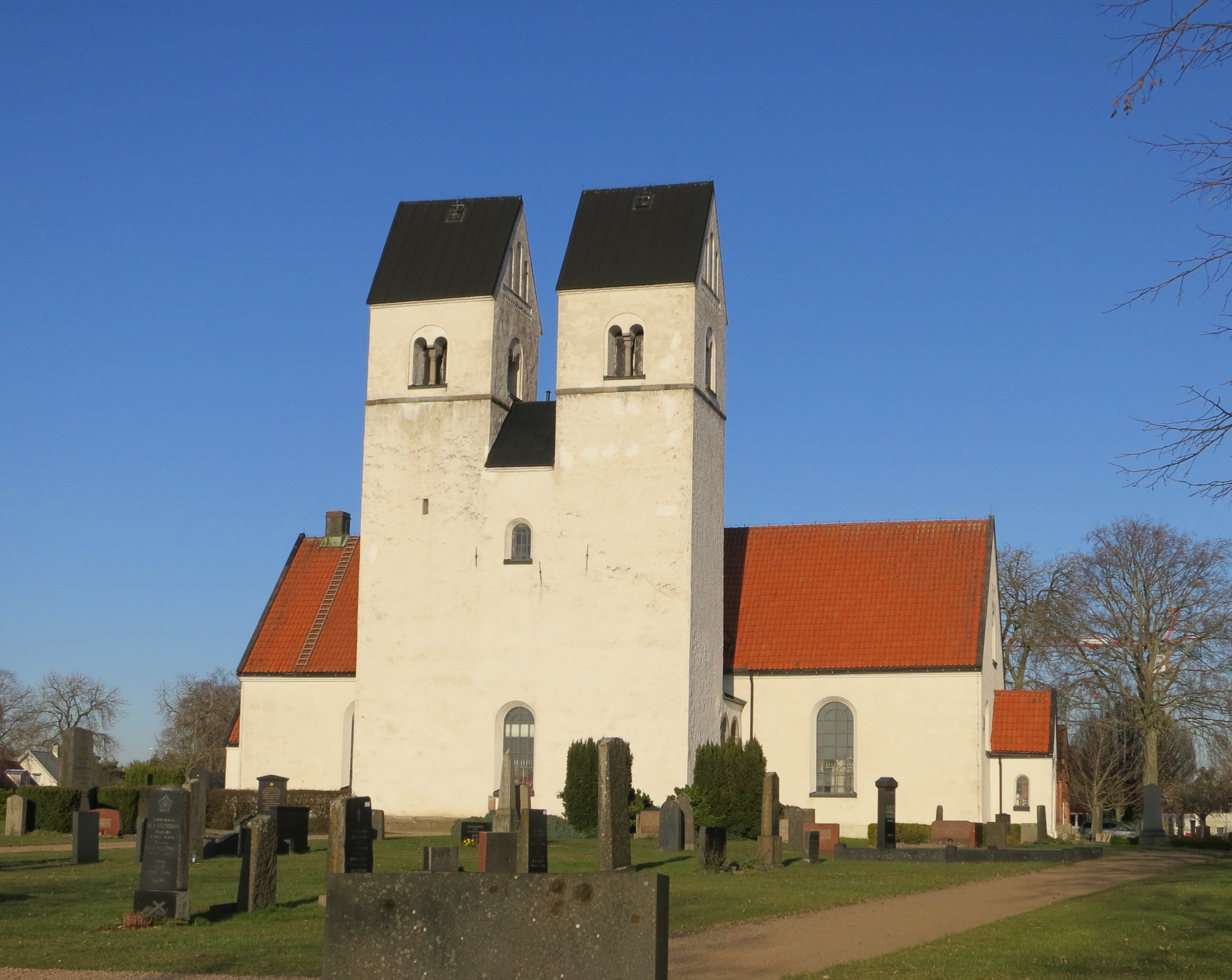
- Färlöv Church, view of the exterior

- 56°04′26″N 14°04′59″E
- Country: Sweden
- Denomination: Church of Sweden

Färlöv Church (Swedish: Färlövs kyrka) is a medieval Lutheran church in Färlöv in the province of Scania, Sweden. It belongs to the Diocese of Lund.

== History ==
The presently visible church was preceded by a wooden stave church, built during the 11th century. The oldest parts of the presently visible Romanesque church date from about 1180. The twin tower, the nave and the choir form the oldest parts of the church. According to legend, the two towers were constructed by the wife of a local knight. The story goes that the knight went away to fight in a war while his wife was pregnant, and asked his servants to build a tower to the church in case she gave birth to a son. When he returned from the war and saw the two towers, he realised that she had given birth to twins. In reality, twin western towers are not an unknown element in Romanesque architecture, although not known from any other parish church in Scania. While it is unknown who built the church and why, the presence of the twin towers thus do denote high ambitions. From the extensive use of finely cut and worked granite, scholars have deduced that the workers building the church probably came from Jutland, where similar granite churches exist. During the 15th century, the vaults in the choir were decorated with murals. During the late Middle Ages the nave was also vaulted; but when the church was enlarged towards the north in 1770, these vaults were destroyed. The southern transept was added roughly a hundred years later.

== Architecture ==
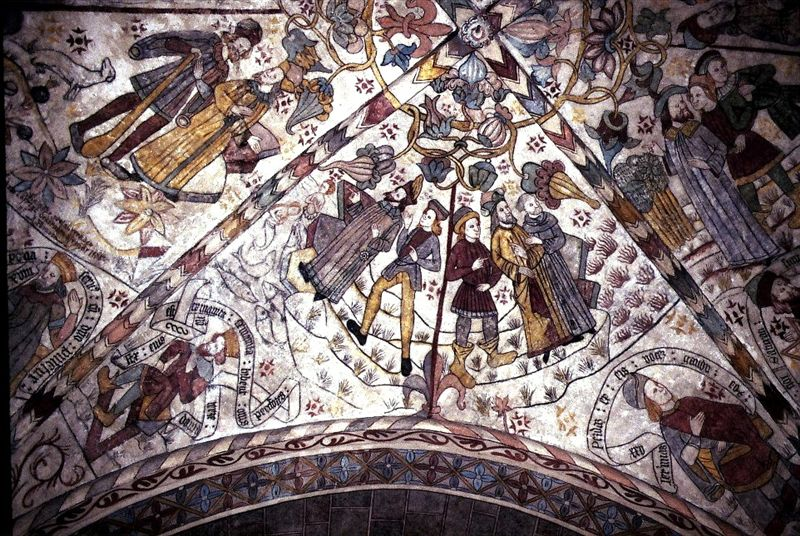
Medieval murals in the choir

As mentioned above, the church consists of a broad western tower with two spires, which is broader than the original nave. In front of the south-western portal is a Romanesque porch with two pillars supporting a roof; this canopy is unparalleled in Swedish church architecture. Traces of masonry found next to the apse indicate that there may have been smaller towers on either side of the apse as well, an arrangement known from Danish Romanesque churches. The church has two transepts, a central nave and a choir with an apse. The exterior of the church is today whitewashed. Internally, the church is characterised by a radical renovation carried out in 1882 by architect Helgo Zettervall in a medievalist fashion. This was reinforced by another, similarly medievalist renovation two decades later. In the choir, the aforementioned paintings are however truly medieval, dating from the 15th century. They depict a motif which is unusual for such church murals in present-day Sweden: scenes from the Last Judgment as interpreted in the Golden Legend.

Among the church fittings, the baptismal font is the oldest. Made of granite, it is contemporary with the church and similar to fonts in Jutland. The font is decorated with sculpted stone lions, in Romanesque style. Of later date but also medieval is a painted wooden statue depicting Saint Peter. It dates from the end of the 15th century and made in northern Germany. The altarpiece, made of oak wood, dates from the 17th century. The church also contains two carved wooden memorial shields, so-called epitaphs, from the 17th and 18th centuries respectively.
