= Çamlıca, Çarşamba =

Çamlıca
- Neighbourhood
- Location in Turkey
- Coordinates: 41°14′N 36°45′E
- Country: Turkey
- Province: Samsun
- District: Çarşamba
- Population (2022): 280
- Time zone: UTC+3 (TRT)

Çamlıca (formerly: Kumarlı) is a neighbourhood of the municipality and district of Çarşamba, Samsun Province, Turkey. Its population is 280 (2022). Located 12 km from the Black Sea coast it is 3km distant from the center of Çarşamba and the distance between this village and the provincial capital of Samsun is 39 km.
