= 1250s in architecture =

- 1240s
- 1250s in architecture
- 1260s
Other topics in 1250s:
- Art
- Music

Architecture timeline

== Buildings and structures ==
=== Buildings ===
- c. 1250
  - Western towers and north rose window of Notre Dame de Paris in the Kingdom of France are built.
  - Hexham Abbey, England completed (begun c. 1170).
  - Konark Sun Temple in Odisha built.
- 1250
  - Château de Spesbourg, Holy Roman Empire built.
  - Ponts Couverts, Strasbourg, opened.
- 1252 – Church of Alcobaça Monastery in Portugal completed.
- c. 1252 – The Franciscan abbey of Claregalway Friary, in Claregalway, County Galway, Ireland is commissioned by Norman knight John de Cogan.
- 1253 – Construction of the upper Basilica of San Francesco d'Assisi in Assisi, designed by Elia Bombardone, is completed.
- 1255 – New Gothic choir of the Tournai Cathedral in the Kingdom of France built.
- 1256 – Construction of Hermann Castle in present-day Estonia is started.
- 1257 – Construction of the Basilica di Santa Chiara in Assisi begun.
- 1258 – The main body of the Salisbury Cathedral (begun in 1220) in Salisbury, England, is completed.
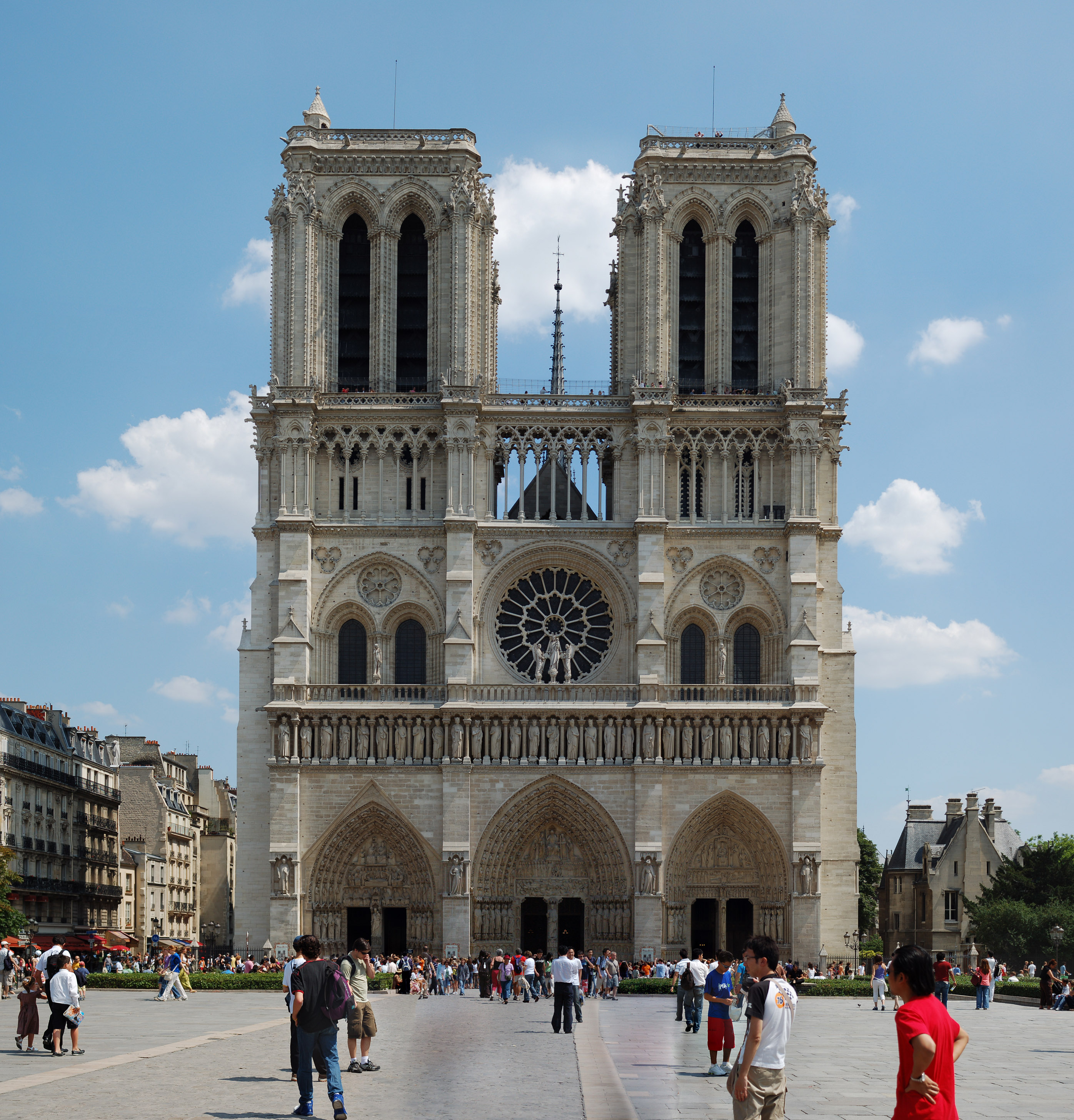
Western Front of Notre Dame de Paris (c. 1250)

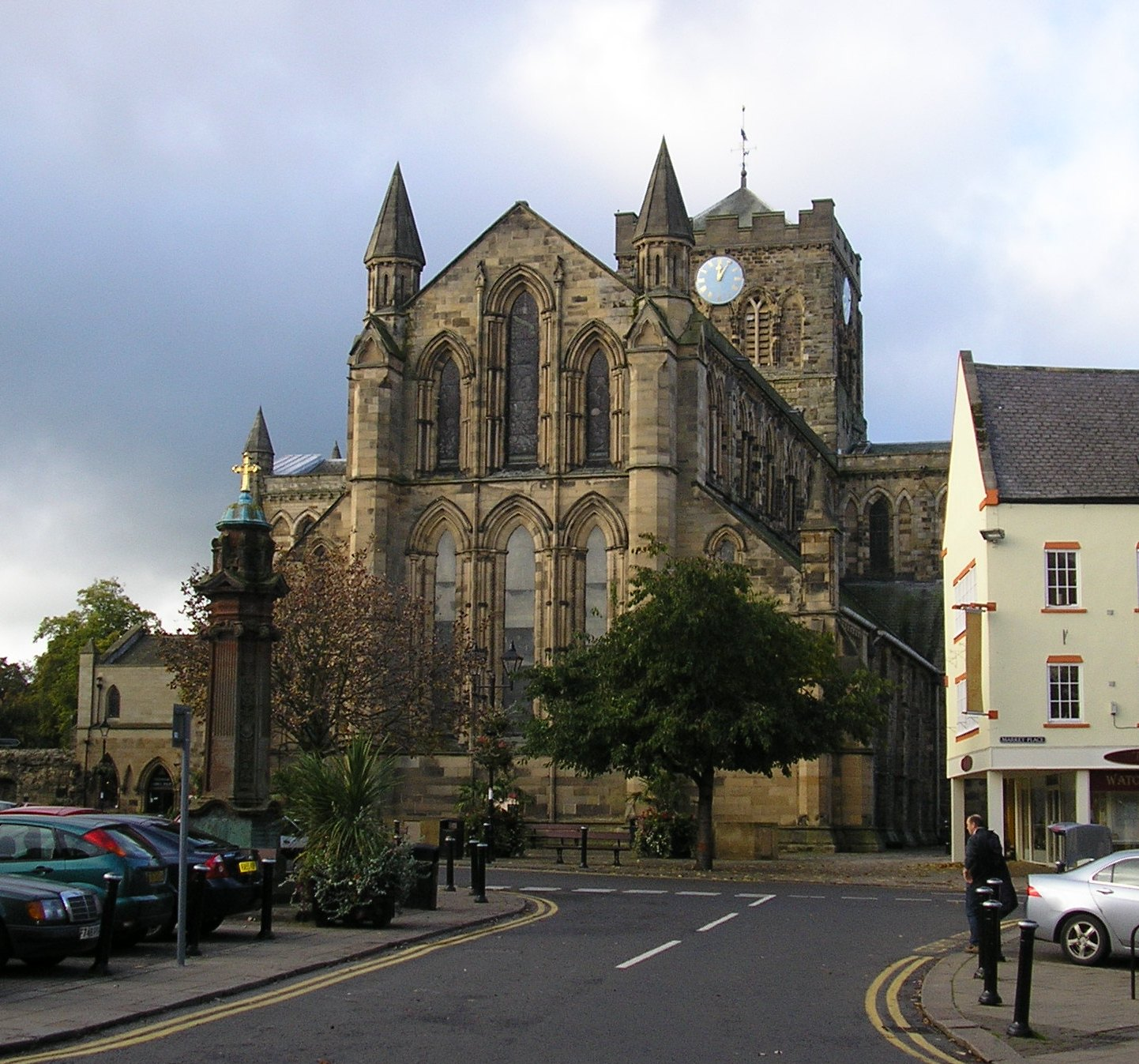
Hexham Abbey (c. 1250)

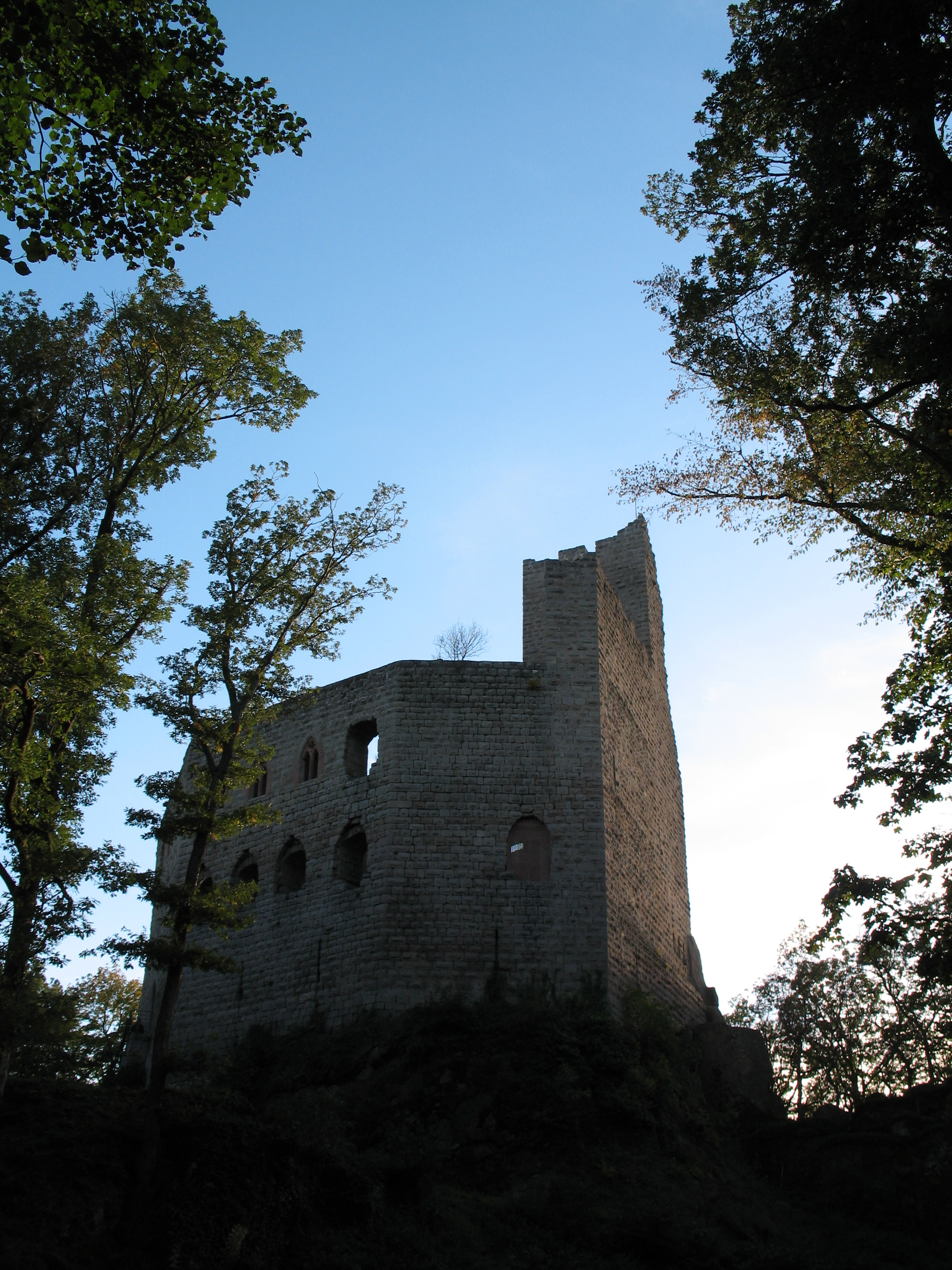
Chateau de Spesbourg (c. 1250)

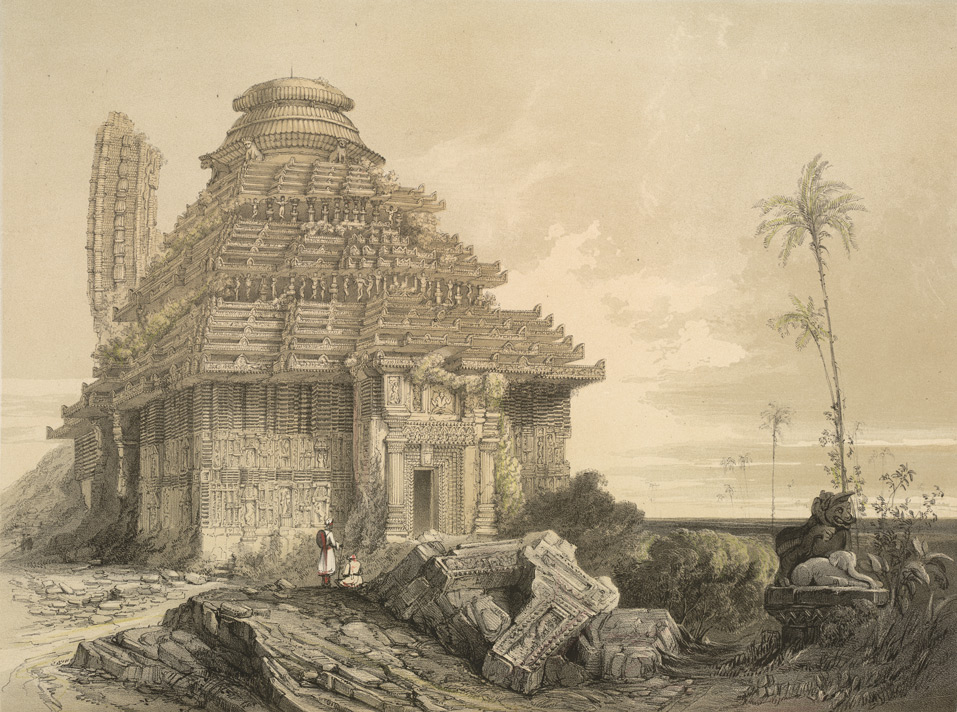
Konark Sun Temple (c. 1250)

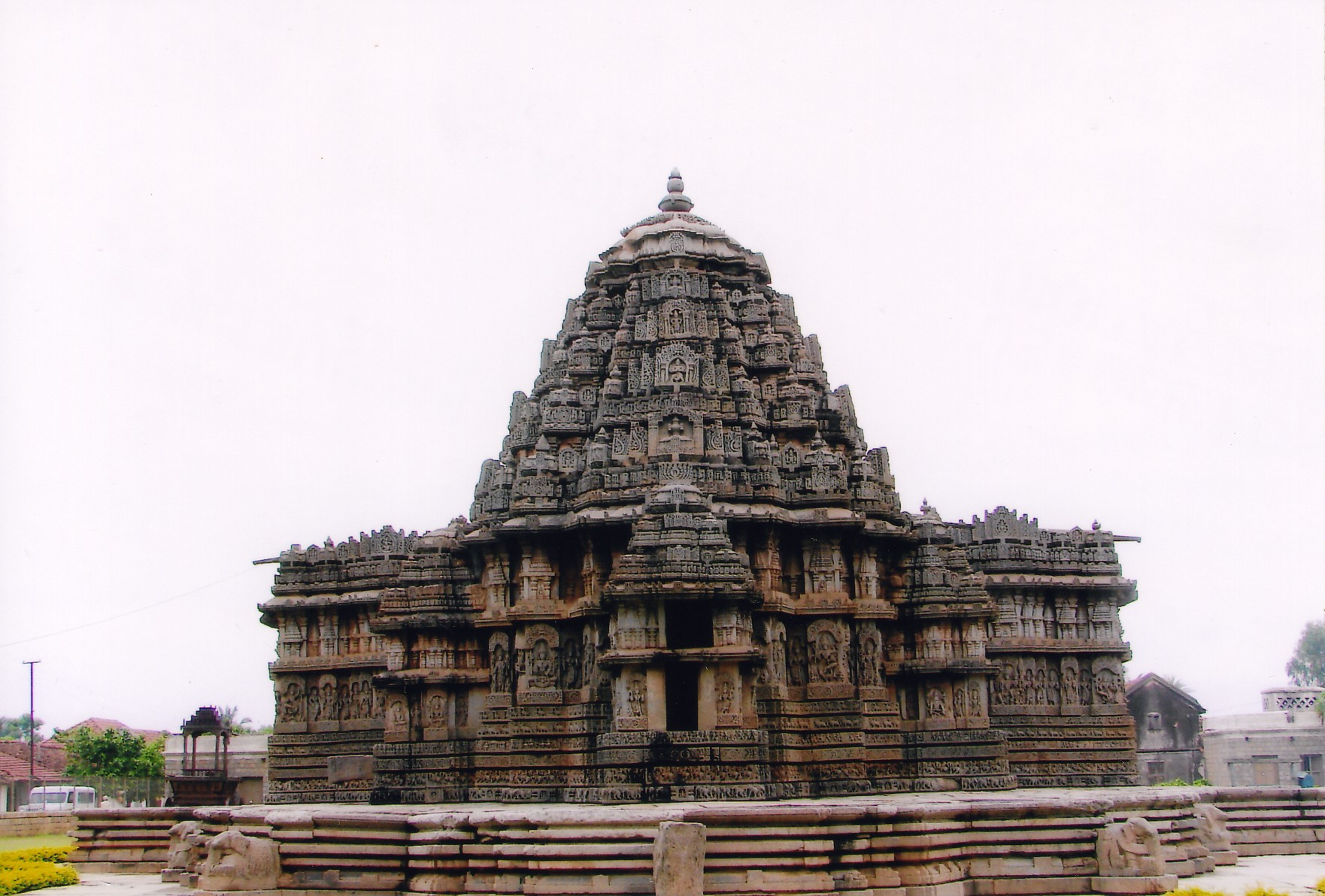
Lakshminarayana Temple, Hosholalu (1250)

Alcobaça Monastery church (1252)

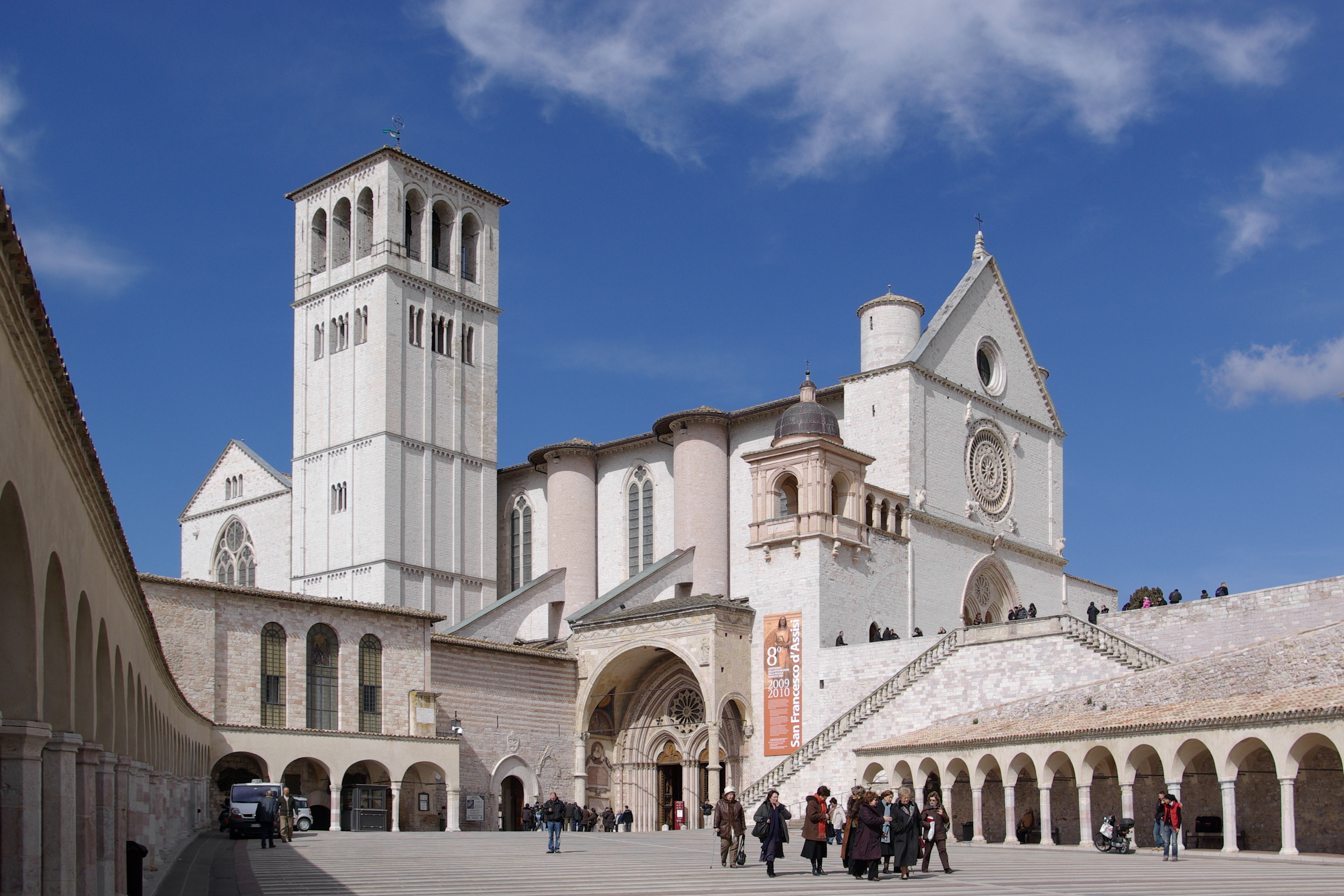
San Francesco d'Assisi (1253)

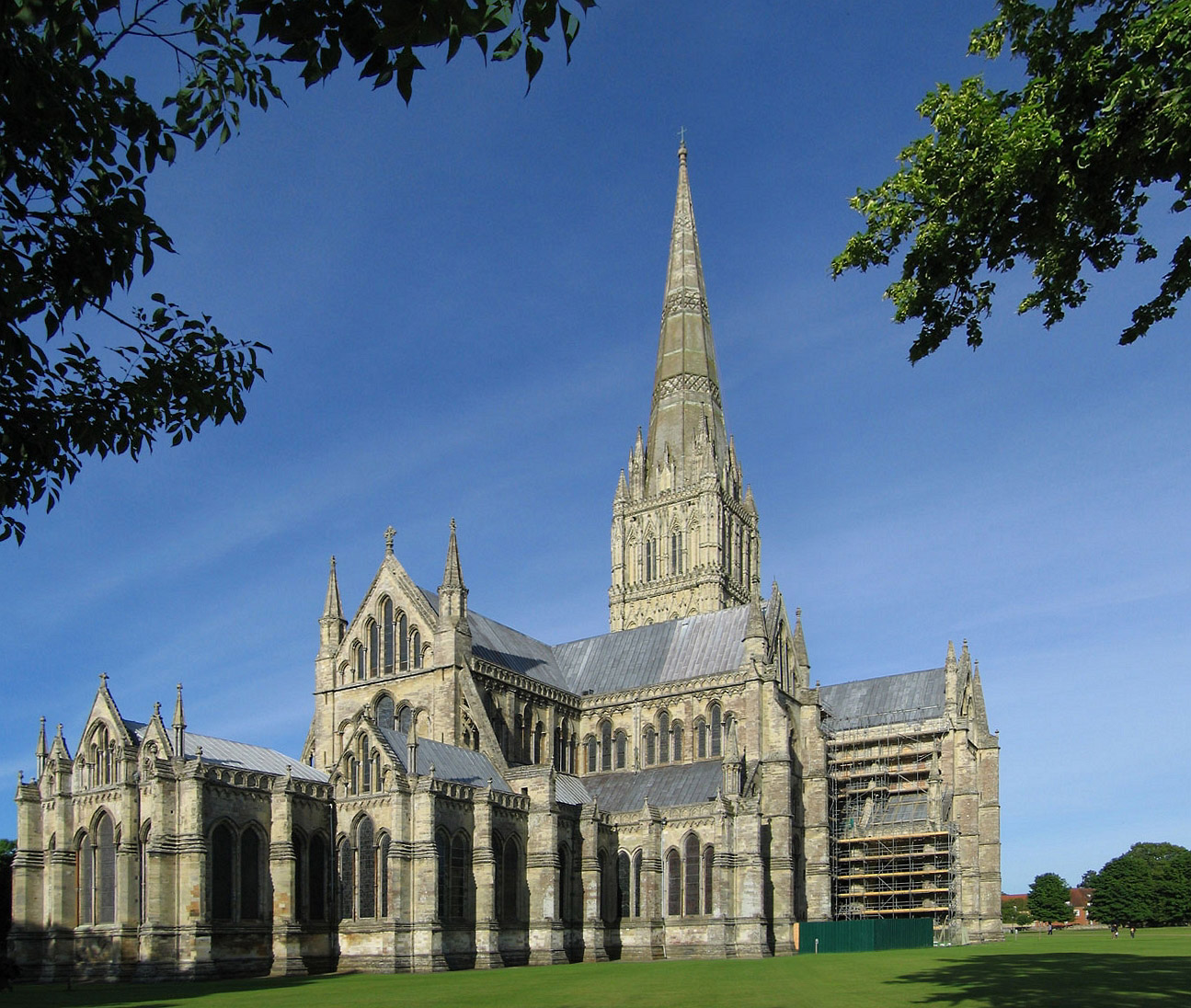
Salisbury Cathedral (1258)

== Births ==
- c. 1250 Giovanni Pisano, Italian sculptor, painter, and architect (d. c. 1315)

== Deaths ==
- none listed
