= 1240s in architecture =

- 1230s
- 1240s in architecture
- 1250s
Other topics in 1240s:
- Art
- Music

Architecture timeline

== Buildings and structures ==
=== Buildings ===
- 1240 – Construction begins of the Castel del Monte in Apulia, Italy, for Frederick II, Holy Roman Emperor; used by Frederick primarily as a hunting lodge.
- 1241 – Cloister of the Basilica of Saint Paul Outside the Walls in Rome completed.
- 1242 – Heddal Stave Church in Norway consecrated, built in the first half of the 13th century.
- 1242 – Rebuilding of Peyrepertuse Castle in France to its current form begun.
- c.1245 – Rebuilding of Westminster Abbey begun.
- 1246 – Lakshmi Narasimha Temple, Nuggehalli built in the Hoysala Empire.
- 1247
  - Basilica of St. Cunibert, Cologne, consecrated.
  - Inauguration of St. Mary's Church, Sigtuna, Sweden.
  - Start of reconstruction of Bassac Abbey.
  - Approximate start of construction of original Pagoda of Monk Wansong in Beijing.
- 1248
  - April 26 – Consecration of Sainte Chapelle, Paris.
  - August 15 – The foundation stone of Cologne Cathedral in Cologne is laid by Archbishop Konrad von Hochstaden.
- 1249 – Sadasiva Temple, Nuggehalli built in the Hoysala Empire.
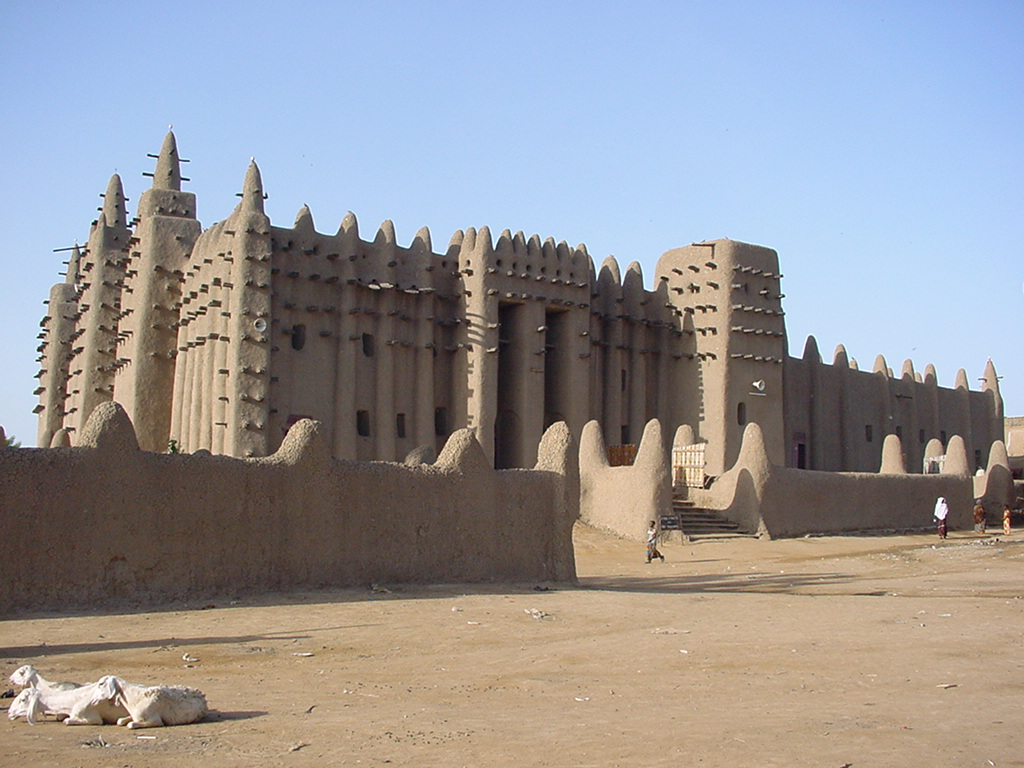
Great Mosque of Djenné (begun 1240)

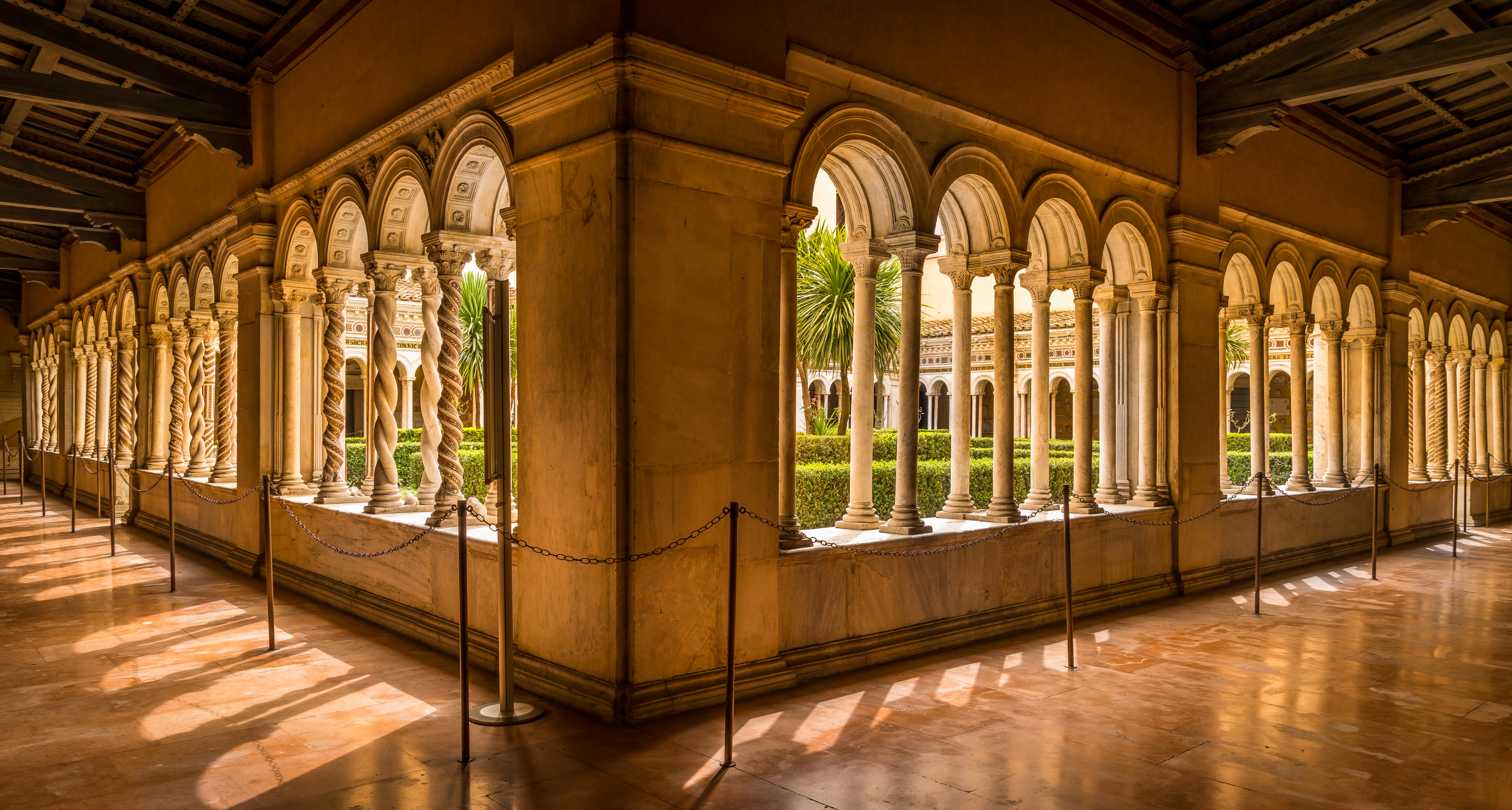
Cloister of Basilica of Saint Paul Outside the Walls, Rome (completed 1241)

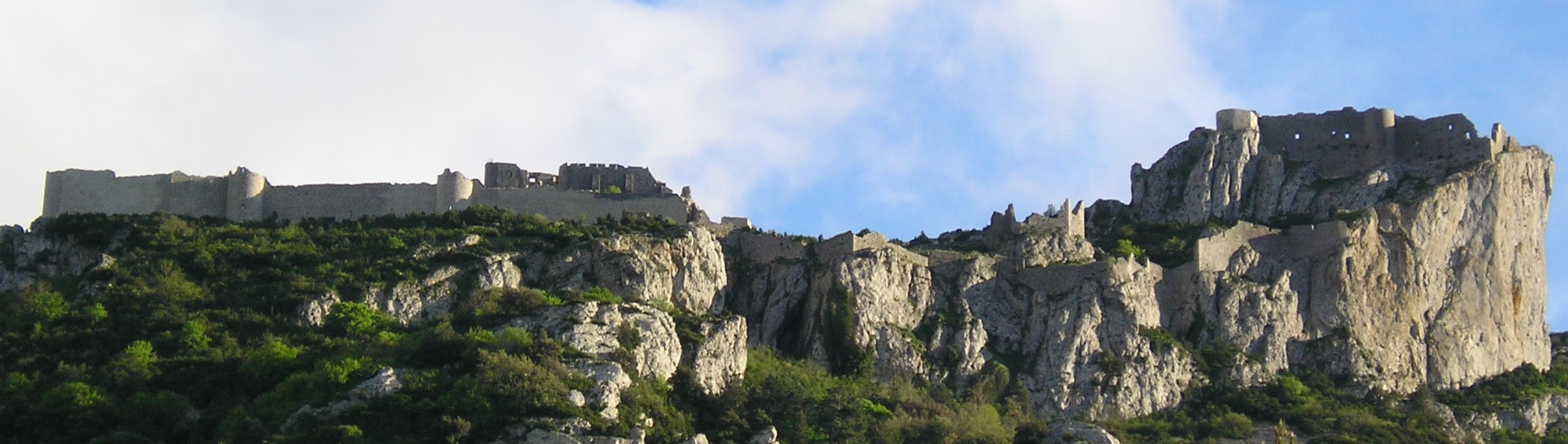
Peyrepertuse Castle (1242)

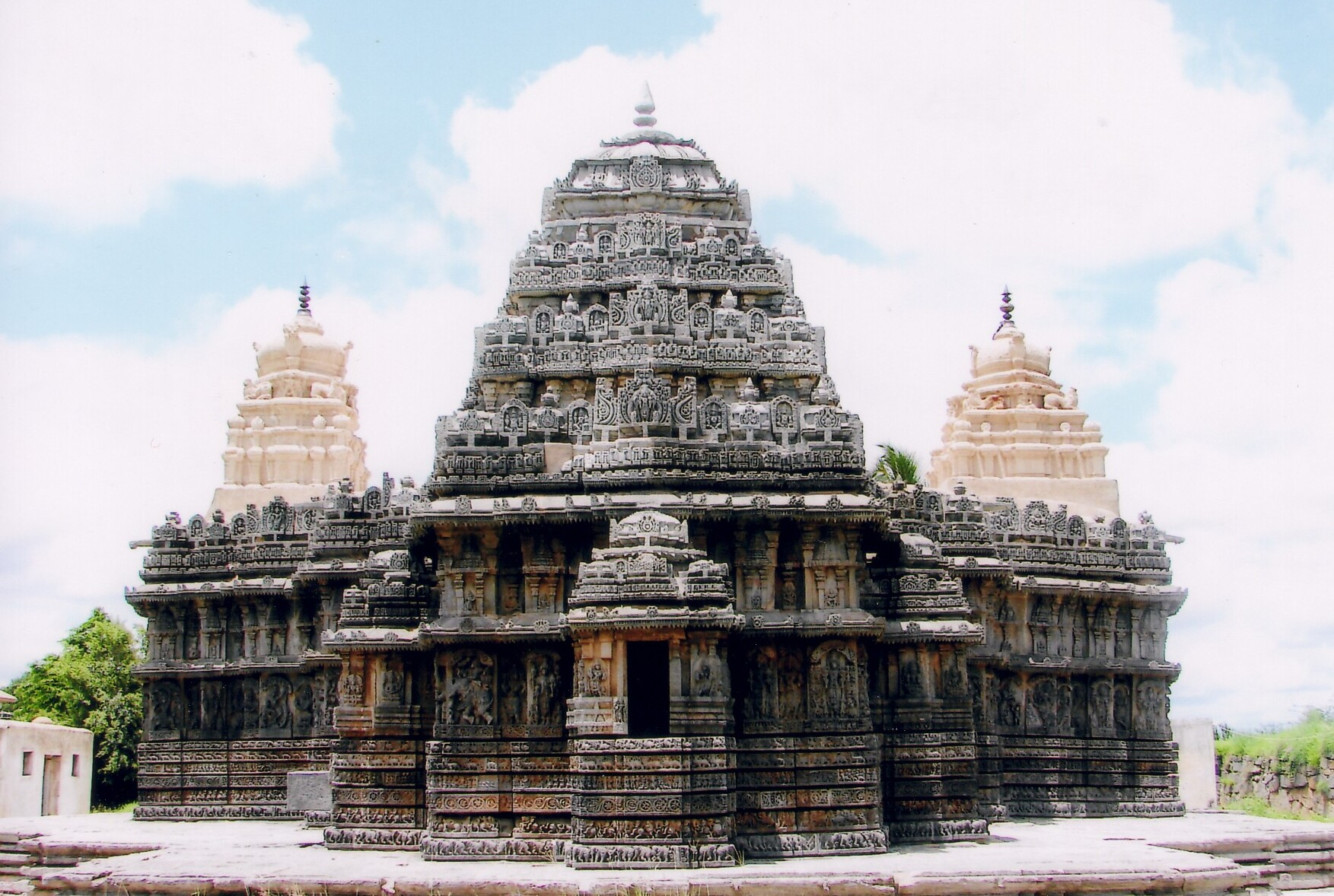
Lakshmi Narasimha Temple, Nuggehalli (1246)

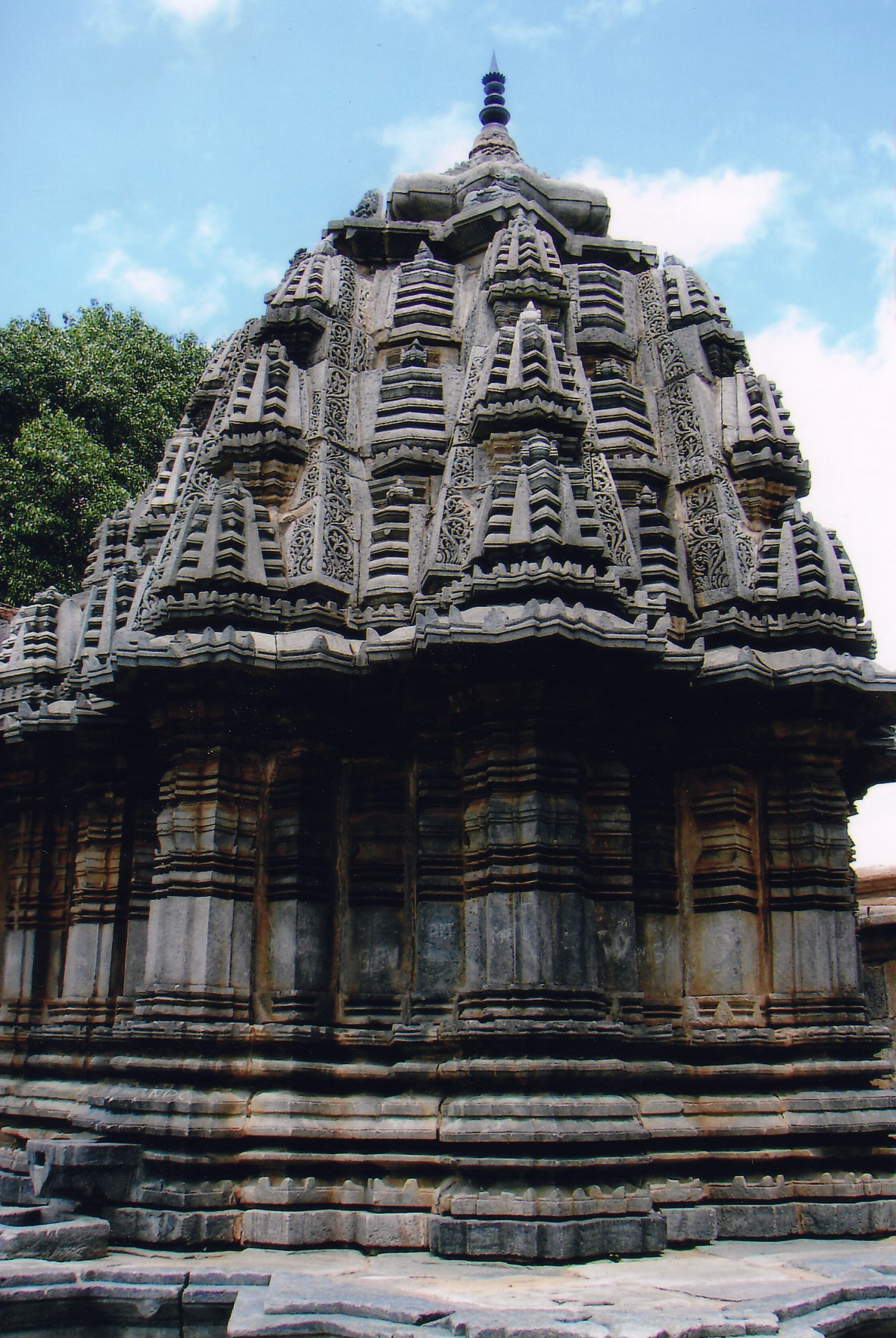
Sadasiva Temple, Nuggehalli (1249)

== Deaths ==
- 1245 – c. June: Elias of Dereham, English canon and building designer
