= Ponts Couverts =

Ponts Couverts may refer to:

- A number of covered bridges where the bridge deck is covered by a roof, for reasons of weather protection or defense against attack
- The Ponts Couverts (Strasbourg), a set of bridges in the French city of Strasbourg that were once covered for defensive reasons
