= Ye Gongchuo =

Chinese politician and art collector

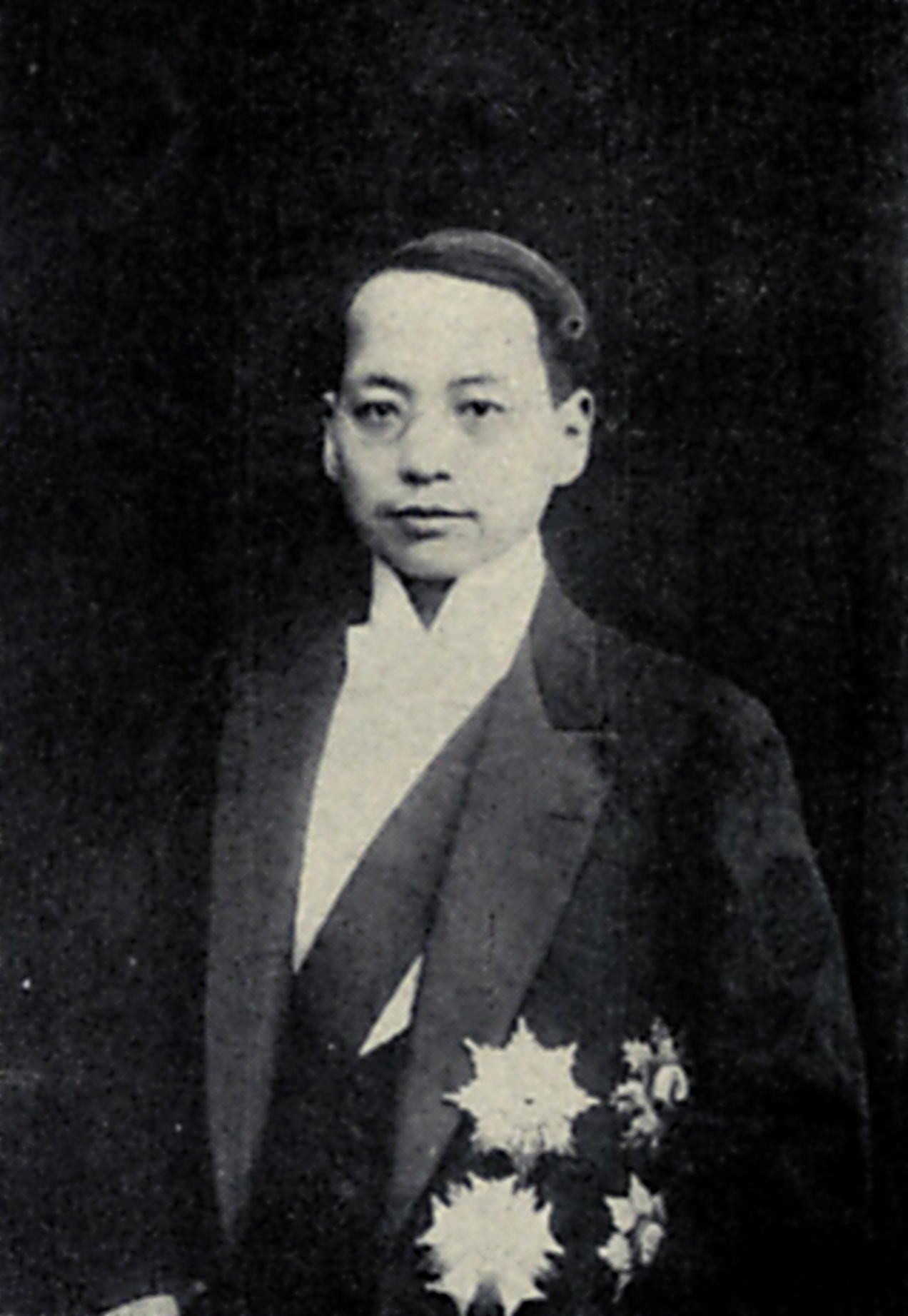
- Ye in the 1920s

Personal details
- Born: 24 November 1881 Panyu County, Guangdong, Qing China
- Died: 6 August 1968 (aged 86) Beijing, China
- Education: Imperial University of Peking

Chinese name
- Traditional Chinese: 葉恭綽
- Simplified Chinese: 叶恭绰
Transcriptions
Standard Mandarin
- Hanyu Pinyin: Yè Gōngchuò
- Wade–Giles: Yeh^{4} Kung^{1}ch'o^{4}
Yue: Cantonese
- Yale Romanization: Yip^{6} Gung^{1} Cheuk^{3}
- Jyutping: Jip^{6} Gung^{1} Coek^{3}

Ye Gongchuo (simplified Chinese: 叶恭绰; traditional Chinese: 葉恭綽; pinyin: Yè Gōng Chuò, 24 November 1881 – 6 August 1968) was a Chinese politician, calligrapher, poet, and art patron. Born in Panyu County, Guangdong, to the family of a Qing dynasty official, Ye passed the imperial examination and joined the Ministry of Posts and Communications. He rose through the ministry rapidly, then allied himself with Sun Yat-sen's anti-Qing movement in the 1911 Revolution. During the first decades of the Republic of China, Ye occupied several ministerial positions as a member of the Communications Clique, at times working with the Beiyang government and other times siding with the Kuomintang.

Withdrawing from politics in 1928, Ye focused on art collection and preservation, organizing several exhibitions and establishing multiple schools and organizations. After the Second World War, he occupied several cultural positions, including vice-president of the Central Research Institute of Culture and History. Works collected by Ye are found in the collections of numerous museums, and he has been recognized for his calligraphy and his ci.

== Biography ==
=== Early life ===
Ye was born in Panyu County, Guangdong, on 11 November 1881. His family had been extensively involved in the arts. Among his ancestors, Ye Renhou (叶仁厚) had been a recognized poet, while his great-grandfather Ye Yinghua (叶英华) had been a skilled lyricist and painter of flowers. His grandfather, Ye Yanlan, was a former court official in the Qing dynasty known for his literary talent. His father, Ye Peicong (叶佩琮), was an accomplished poet.

Ye began learning calligraphy around age five, and had begun producing poetry by the age of seven. He was a voracious reader, continuing into adolescence. As an adult, Ye took two courtesy names, Yufu (裕甫) and Yuhu (誉虎). In his later life, Ye took the pseudonyms Xia'an (遐庵) and Xiaweng (遐翁).

Ye sat the imperial examination at the age of eighteen, writing an essay on the railways. In 1902, he enrolled at the Imperial University of Peking. After graduating, he spent years teaching at the School of Modern Language in Hubei. Having gained the attention of the government, he was recruited by the Ministry of Posts and Communications. At first a clerk, he rose through the ranks to lead the Chinese Imperial Post and supervised the railways by 1906. Working with the Bank of Communications, he was involved in the acquisition of the Beijing–Hankou railway from its foreign owners, as well as the construction of the Lu-Hankou railway.

=== Political career ===
During the 1911 Revolution, Ye left government service. He ultimately sided with the anti-Qing movement led by Sun Yat-sen, and was tasked with facilitating negotiations between the Qing-allied North and the Sun-allied South. He also helped organize the provisional government.

Following the establishment of the Republic of China, he became a prominent leader of the government. In 1912, he served concurrently as the Director of the Road Administration and Director of General Railway Administration at the Ministry of Communications. In this capacity, he served as chairman of the Commission on the Standardization of Railway Terminology and the Commission for the Unification of Railway Statistics and Accounts. He was thus responsible for determining the terminology used by China's government and private railroads, and engaged an American statistician as an advisor.

Ye established good relations with Liang Shiyi, the Minister of Posts and Communications, and became a prominent member of his Communications Clique. In 1913, he was appointed deputy Minister of Communications; this position was made substantive the following year. Ye was suspended in June 1915, due to perceived irregularities in his administration, though he was cleared and reinstated in October. During the First World War, he worked with Liang to organize the Huimin Company, which sent Chinese labourers to Europe to support the Allies. During this period, Ye also served as General Manager of the Bank of Communications.

Following the death of Yuan Shikai, Liang – who had strongly supported the president and self-proclaimed emperor – lost favour and was removed from the government. Ye likewise left the Ministry, becoming the secretary to Vice-President Feng Guozhang. When General Zhang Xun initiated a campaign to reinstate Puyi, the last emperor of the Qing dynasty, to the throne, Ye handled the logistics for General Duan Qirui and his anti-monarchist forces. Duan assumed the premiership after his campaign concluded, and Ye was appointed Deputy Minister of Communications. He held this position until October 1918, and in January 1919, he was dispatched to Europe as a special commissioner tasked with studying post-war industry and communications.

Ye returned to China by the end of the year, and in January he was made High Commissioner for Promotion of Industries. In August of that year, he was appointed Acting Minister of Communication, under Premier Jin Yunpeng. He held this position until May 1921, when he was removed. He was reappointed in December of that year by incoming premier Liang Shiyi. When the cabinet collapsed the following year, Ye was forced to flee to Japan, as a warrant had been issued for his arrest.

Ye soon returned to China, and during the First Zhili–Fengtian War he backed the Fengtian clique, having gained the confidence of General Zhang Zuolin. He also spent time as Minister of Finance for Sun Yat Sen's Guangdong-based Kuomintang government. Following the Second Zhili–Fengtian War, at which time the Fengtian clique assumed control of Beijing, Ye again became Minister of Communication in the north, serving under Premier Yan Huiqing. In this capacity, he spearheaded the restoration of the Pagoda of Monk Wansong in Beijing.

=== Turn to arts ===
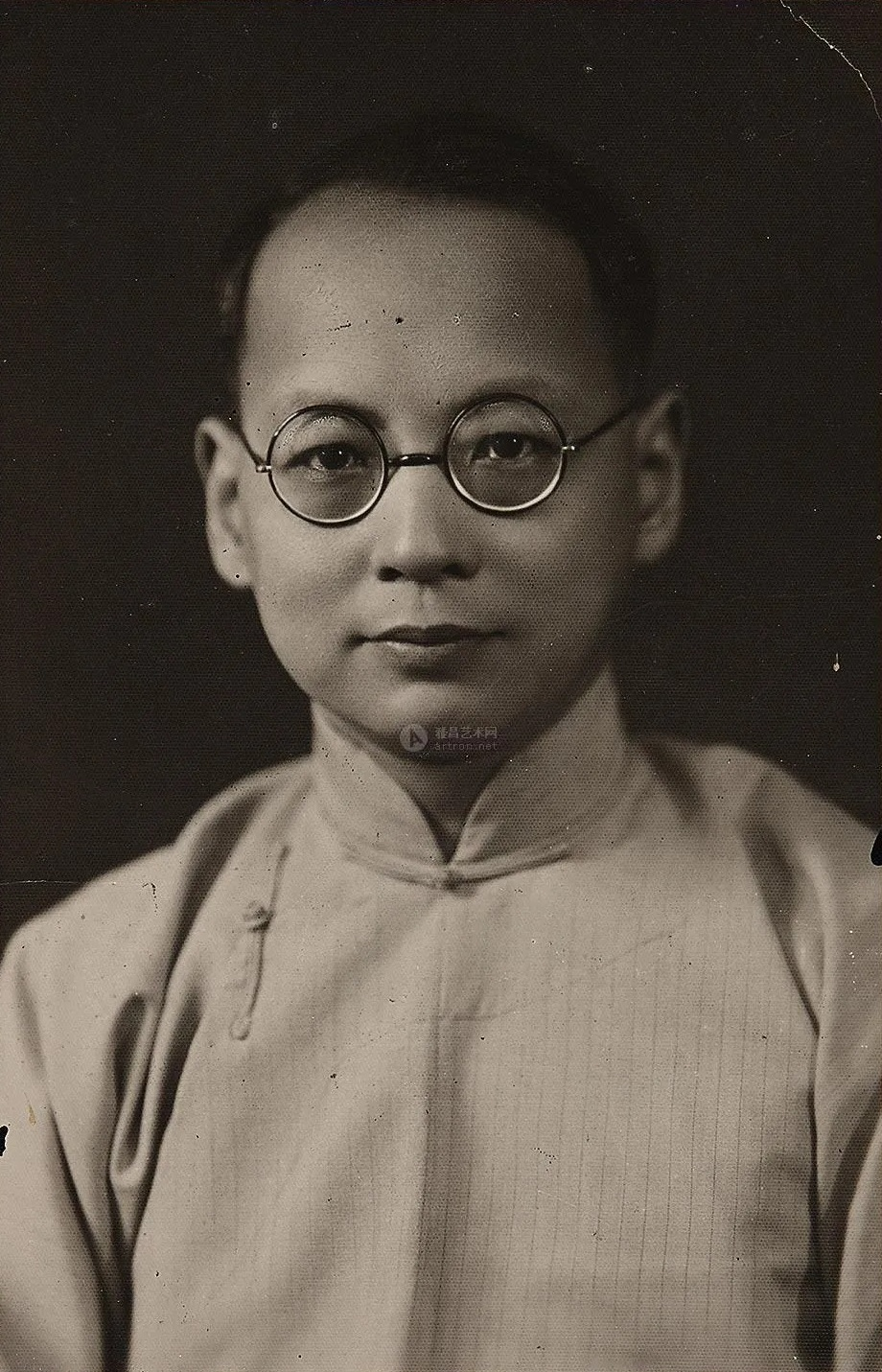
Ye in a 1931 portrait

As he became increasingly disillusioned with the republican government, Ye left government service in 1928. He retreated to his art, becoming an art patron and collector. He used his influence to ensure the protection of several Buddhist statues from the Northern Wei dynasty that had been found in the Yungang Grottoes near Pingcheng, Shanxi. In 1928, he organized the First National Art Exhibition in China, serving as an executive member of the planning committee. That year, he also published the first volume of his series on Qing-dynasty officials, using paintings and biographies that had been compiled by his grandfather; a second volume, containing paintings collected by Ye himself, was published in 1953.

When Cai Yuanpei sought to establish the National Music Conservatory, Ye was involved in the fundraising and served on its board of trustees. He also organized an exhibition of Japanese painting in Shanghai, worked with Rabindranath Tagore to establish a school for Chinese studies at the Visva-Bharati College in Shantiniketan in India, and helped plan the Sun Yat-sen Mausoleum in Nanjing. In 1930, Ye served as the director of the Palace Museum at the Forbidden City in Beijing. The following year, he helped establish the Chinese painting society. With Zhu Qiqian, he co-founded the Chinese Architectural Society.

In 1933, Ye was one of the artists asked to represent China during an exhibition in Berlin. Ye travelled to Shanghai with Gao Qifeng for a meeting with Xu Beihong, Chen Shuren, and Liu Haisu, the other delegates, though Gao died shortly after the passage. In October of that year, after returning to China, Ye was tasked with establishing an art museum in Shanghai. He then organized an exhibition of cultural documents, which opened on 1 June 1937 and featured contributions from Gao, Chang Dai-chien, Wu Hufan, and Zhang Kunyi. It was abbreviated, however, by the outbreak of the Second Sino-Japanese War.

=== Return to China and death ===
Ye oversaw the storage of the exhibits at the Aurora University Museum in Shanghai's French concession, then left for Hong Kong, where he earned a living selling his calligraphy and art. After that city fell to the Japanese in December 1941, he returned to Shanghai, spending some time in Guangzhou before ultimately moving back to Hong Kong in 1948. While in Hong Kong, he established the Chinese Cultural Association.

He returned to China in 1949, having been invited by Mao Zedong to assume positions as director of the Academy of Traditional Chinese Painting and as vice-president of the Central Research Institute of Culture and History. According to the British Museum, Ye was dissatisfied with these, and cautious of the emergent anti-intellectualism. Elsewhere, he participated in the Cultural and Educational Committee of the State Council of the People's Republic of China as well as the Language Reform Committee. He was also the first president of the Beijing Academy of Painting. He continued to urge the protection of cultural monuments, petitioning Mao to preserve the tomb of Yuan Chonghuan.

During the Cultural Revolution, though promised safety, Ye was fearful. After he was accused of propagating "bureaucratic capitalism" by The People's Daily, he fell ill. He died at his home on 6 August 1968. In 1980, he was posthumously cleared of these charges and reburied near a pavilion he had erected at the Sun Yat-sen Mausoleum.

== Legacy ==
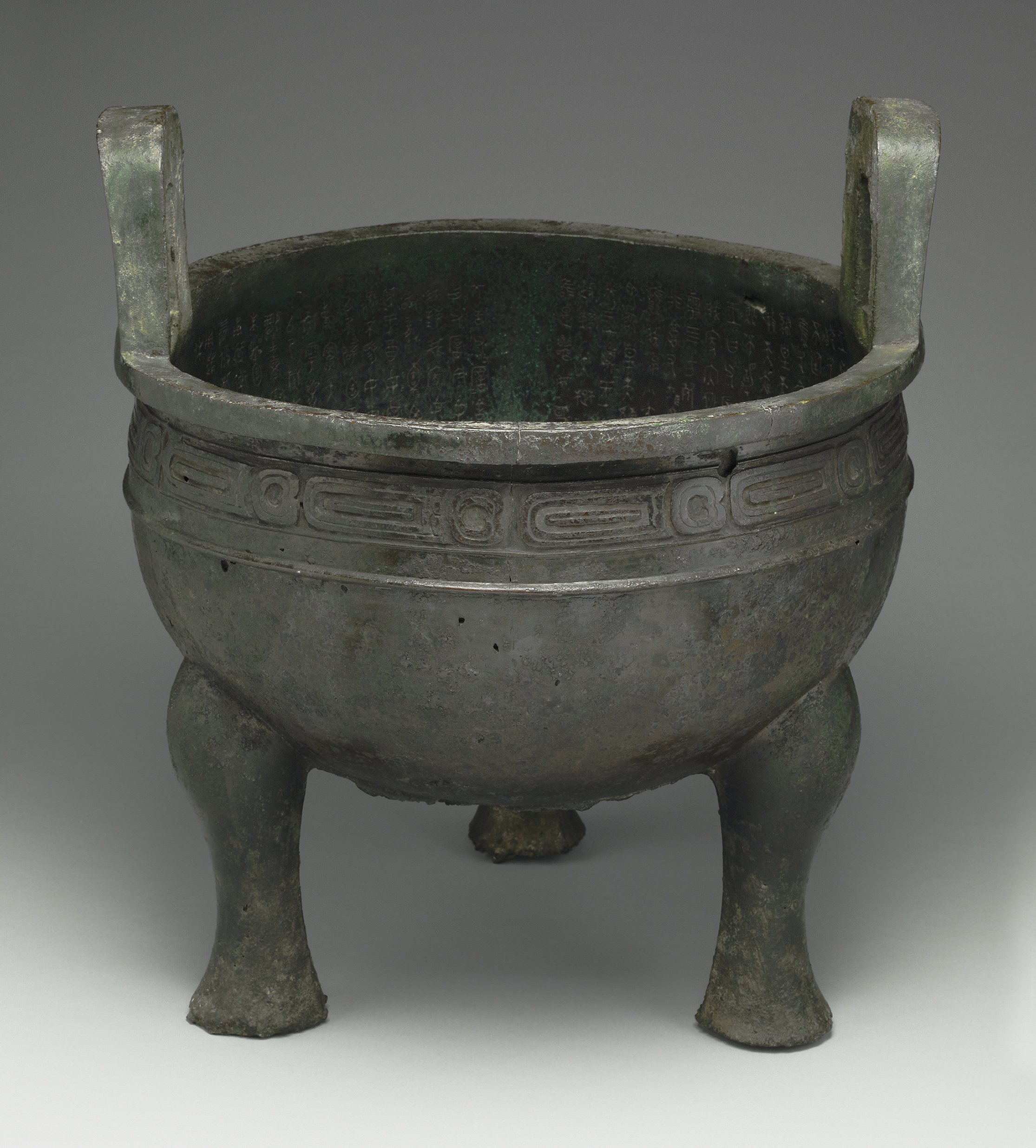
The Mao Gong ding; once owned by Ye, now in the collection of the National Palace Museum in Taipei

For his contributions to the republican government, Ye received several awards, including the First Class Wenfu, the first class Tashou Chiaho, and the first class Tashou Paokuang Chiaho. Much of Ye's art collection has been donated to museums. The Guangzhou Art Museum houses approximately 37 items that were donated by Ye, including Bamboo Facing the Wind (迎风竹) by the Ming-era artist Liang Yuanzhu as well as two late-Ming/early-Qing albums, Scholars of Nanyuan Sending Li Meizhou to the North (南园诸子送黎美周北上) and Li Suiqiu Sending Qu Qi to the North (黎遂球送区启北上). Ye acquired the Mao Gong ding in the 1910s. He refused to sell it to foreign investors, only agreeing to sell the vessel to Eugene Chen during the Second World War, when the Japanese were searching for it; the ding is now at the National Palace Museum in Taipei. Ye donated Wang Xianzhi's Duck Head Pills Letter, which dates back to the Jin dynasty, to the Shanghai Museum.

== Analysis ==
The British Museum identifies Ye as one of early 20th-century China's foremost calligraphers, together with Yu Youren and Shen Yinmo. In his calligraphy, Ye emphasised the specific production of individual characters, referring to the scripts produced during the Han and Northern Wei dynasties as exemplars. He drew inspiration from the Duobao Pagoda Stele, a work created by the Tang-era calligrapher Yan Zhenqing, as well as the works of Huang Tingjian and Zhao Mengfu. He underscored the importance of maintaining tranquility and harmony, with the calligraphy brush acting in coordination with the body. Ye did some painting as well, favouring depictions of pine, bamboo, plums, and orchids. These employed a freehand approach, which The Paper describes as harkening back to the literati painting from which he often drew inspiration.

As with several of his ancestors, Ye produced a number of ci. He was educated in poetry by Tan Xian, and later drew influences from such poets as Zhou Xiaozang, Kuang Zhouyi, and Wen Tingshi. Zhu Yongzhai, in his discussion of contemporary ci poets, noted that Ye drew from extensive reading and knowledge of classical Chinese poetry. According to Zhu, some of Ye's works evoked a lingering sadness, reminiscent of the poetry of He Zhu, while others blended the majestic styles of Su Shi, Zhou Bangyan, and Xin Qiji. Ye published several books dealing with poetry, generally using his pseudonym Xi'an. These included Collected Drafts by Xi'an (遐庵汇稿) and A Complete Collection of Ci from the Qing Dynasty (全清词钞).

== Works cited ==
- Andrews, Julia F.; Shen, Kuiyi (2012). The Art of Modern China. Berkeley, California: University of California Press. ISBN 978-0-520-23814-5.
- Aviv, Eyal (2020). Differentiating the Pearl from the Fish-Eye: Ouyang Jingwu and the Revival of Scholastic Buddhism. Leiden: Brill. ISBN 978-90-04-43791-3.
- Cai Dengshan (蔡登山) (25 August 2023). "番禺高奇峰：未尽其才的"岭南三杰" [Panyu Gao Qifeng: The "Three Heroes of Lingnan" Who Did Not Use His Talents to Their Fullest]. Dute News (in Chinese). Shenzhen Media Group.
- Knight, Michael; Li, He (2006). The Elegant Gathering: The Yeh Family Collection. Asian Art Museum. ISBN 978-0-939117-33-8.
- Powell, J. B., ed. (1919). Who's Who in China, 1918–1919. Shanghai: Millard's Review.
- Powell, J. B., ed. (1925). Who's Who in China. Shanghai: Millard's Review.
- Qijie (奇洁) (7 August 2018). "纪念｜叶恭绰逝世五十周年：衣被满天下 谁能识其恩" [Commemorating the 50th Anniversary of Ye Gongchuo's Death: Who Can Recognize His Kindness When His Clothes and Bedding Are All Over the World?]. The Paper (in Chinese). Archived from the original on 24 September 2024.
- Who's Who in China: Biographies of Chinese Leaders. Shanghai: The China Weekly Review. 1936.
- Yan Jiasen (严家森) Ma Xiao (马潇) (5 August 2003). "[祖孙篇 叶衍兰 叶恭绰] 进则为达官，退亦是名士" [[Grandparents and Grandchildren: Ye Yanlan and Ye Gongchuo] If You Advance, You Will Be a High Official; If You Retreat, You Will Be a Famous Scholar]. Southern Metropolis Daily (in Chinese). Archived from the original on 12 August 2022. (via Guangdong Library)
- "Ye Gongchuo 葉恭綽". The British Museum.
- "叶恭绰" [Ye Gongchuo] (in Chinese). Palace Museum. Archived from the original on 23 September 2024.
