= 1230s in architecture =

- 1220s
- 1230s in architecture
- 1240s
Other topics in 1230s:
- Art
- Music

This is a list of events related to architecture in the 1230s.

== Buildings and structures ==
=== Buildings ===
- 1230
  - Santa Maria della Spina, Pisa, Italy built
  - Ponte Vella at Ourense in Galicia (Spain) rebuilt on Roman foundations
  - Luna Vasahi of the Dilwara Temples in India built
  - Church of the Jacobins in Toulouse is begun
  - Chateau d'Angers begun.
- 1234
  - Aqsab Mosque, Damascus, Syria built
  - Saint-Martin Church, Colmar begun
- 1235
  - Limburg Cathedral in the Holy Roman Empire consecrated
  - Great Hall of Winchester Castle in England completed to a "double cube" design
  - Approximate date – Saint-Léger of Guebwiller in the Holy Roman Empire is completed
- 1238
  - Construction of the Alhambra in Granada begins; it is said that each sovereign of the dynasty of the Nasrides brings a stone to the edifice, and by the end of the Reconquista in 1492, the latest refinements to the palace will have been completed
  - Torre dei Conti built in Rome
- 1239 – St. Mark Basilica of Heraklion, Venetian Crete, built
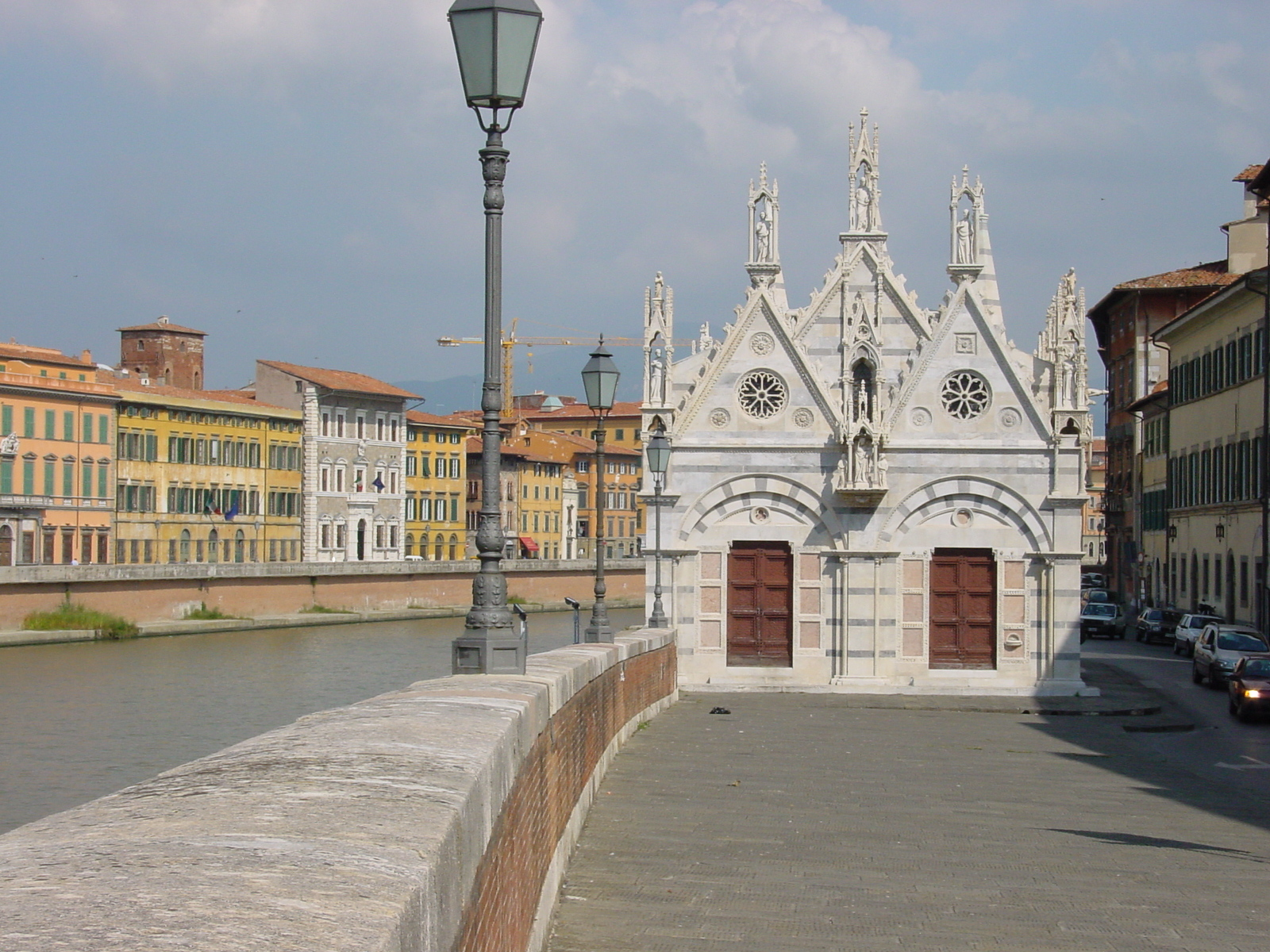
Santa Maria della Spina, Pisa (1230)

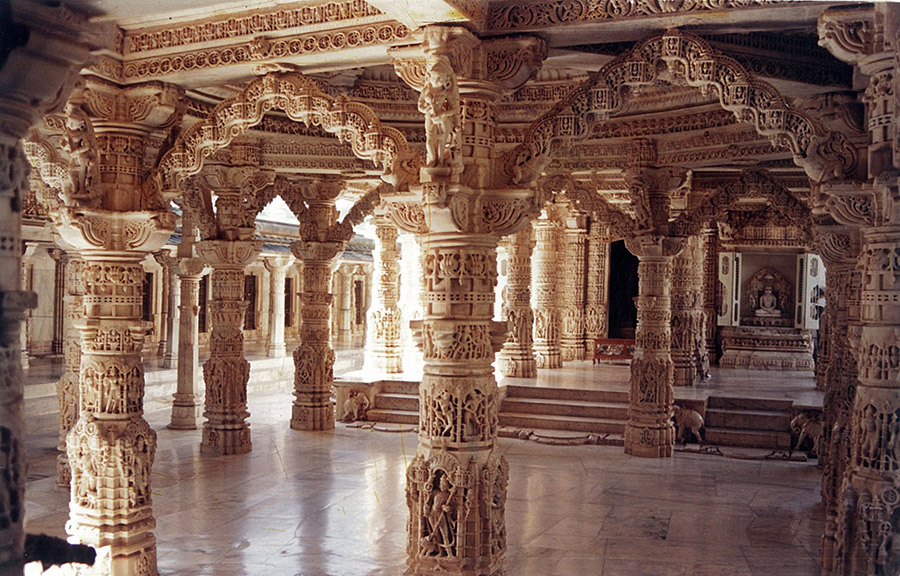
Luna Vasahi, Dilwara (1230)

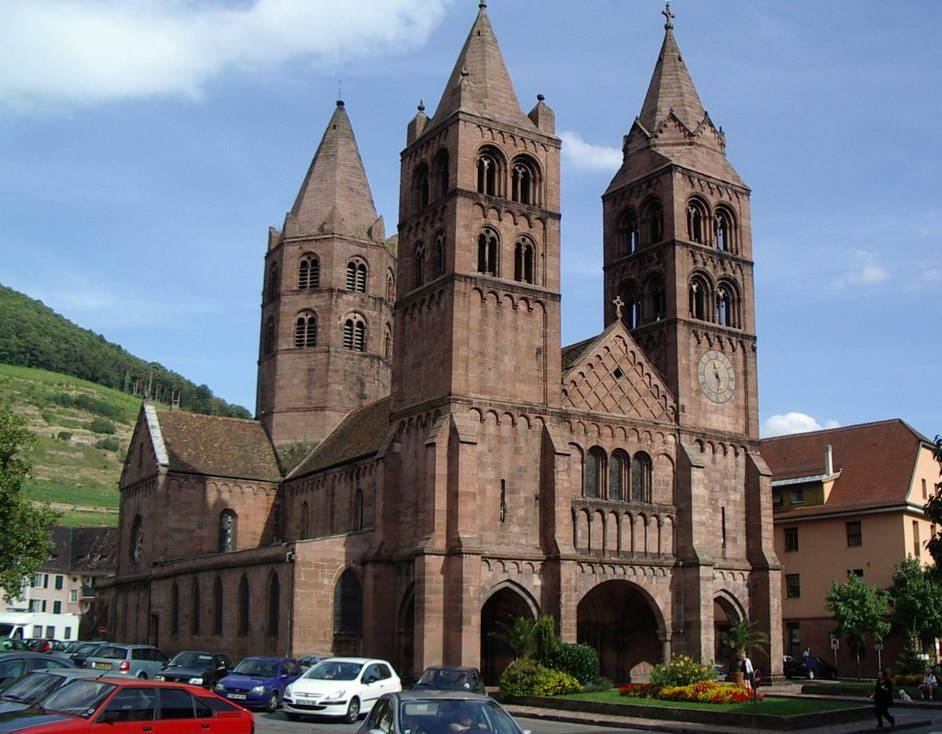
Saint-Léger of Guebwiller (1235)

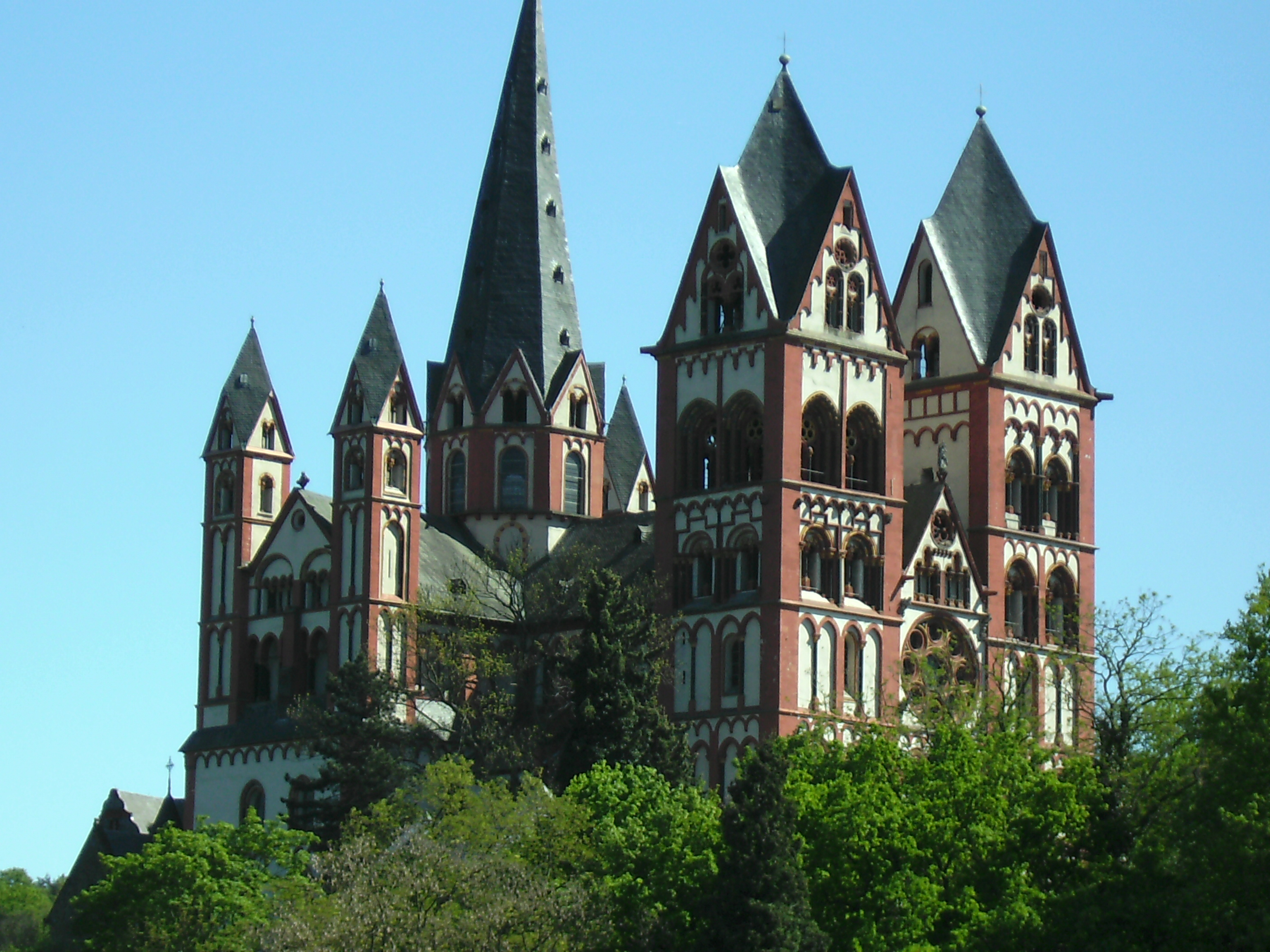
Limburg Cathedral (1235)

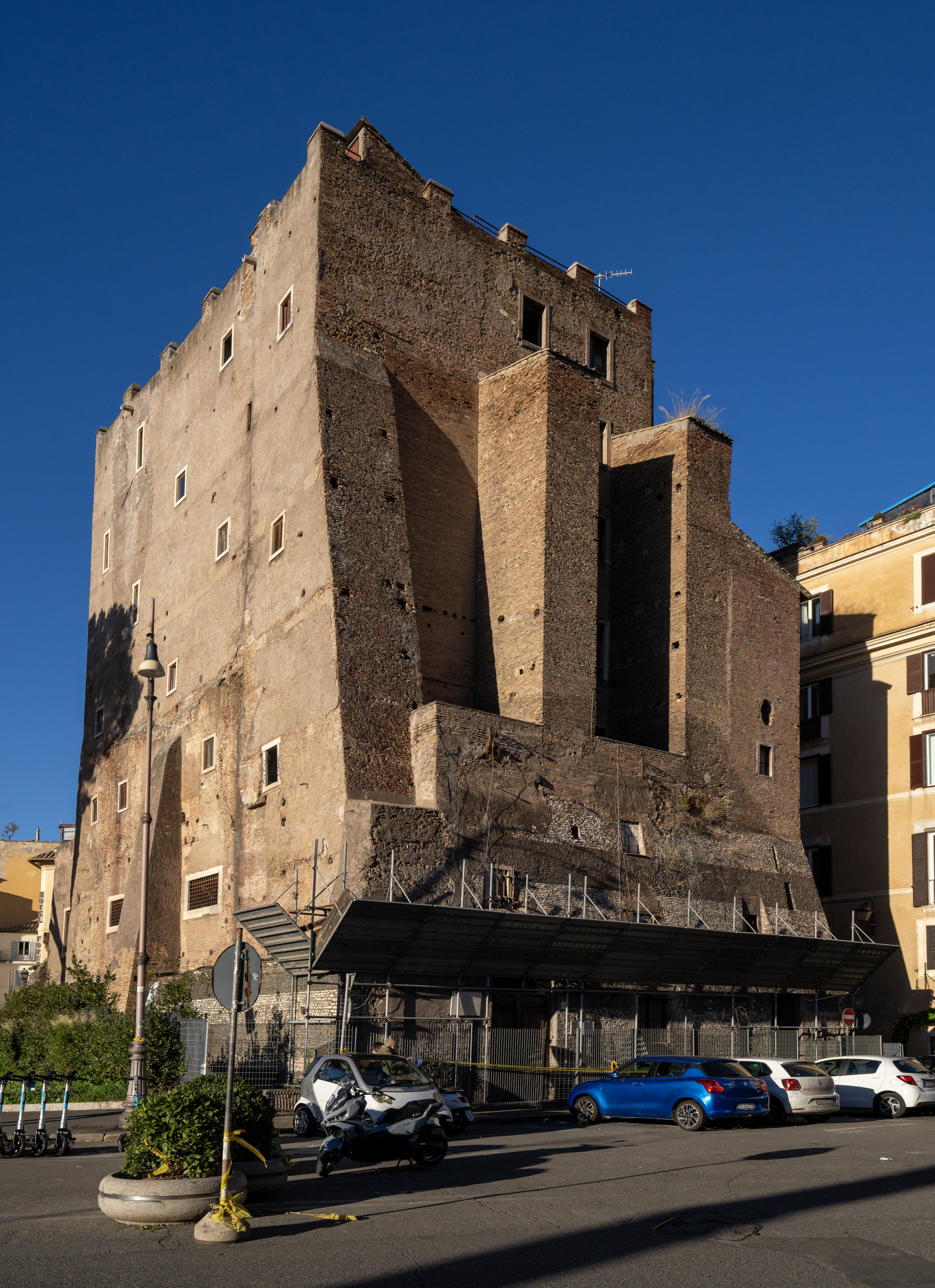
Torre dei Conti, Rome (1238)

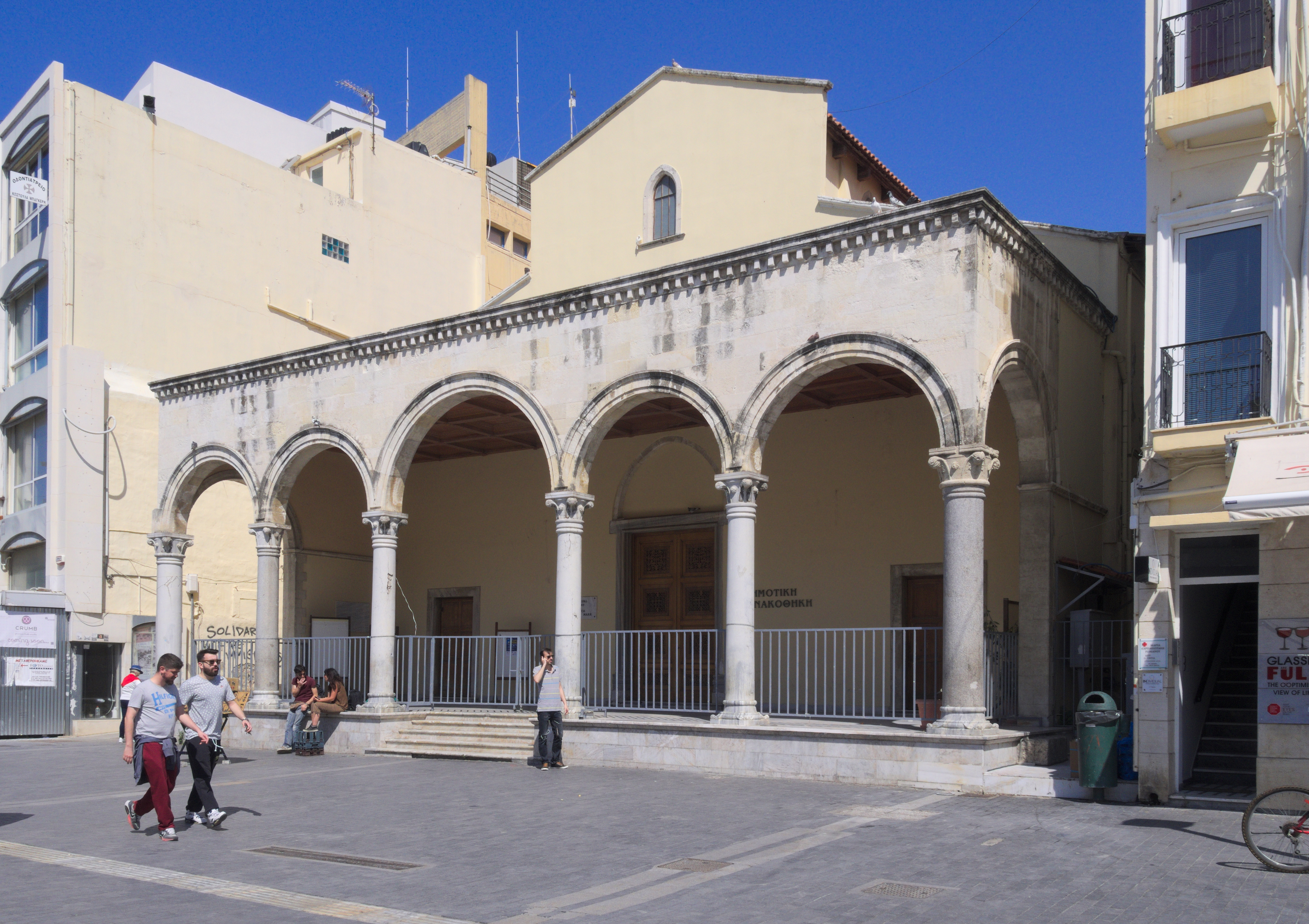
St. Mark Basilica of Heraklion (1239)
