= 1220s in architecture =

- 1210s
- 1220s in architecture
- 1230s
Other topics in 1220s:
- Art
- Music

== Buildings and structures ==
=== Buildings ===
- Early 1220s – Chlemoutsi Crusader castle in Greece is built.
- 1220
  - Bishop Evrard de Fouilly initiates work on Amiens Cathedral, in Amiens, France, with Robert de Luzarches serving as architect until 1228.
  - Brussels Cathedral begun.
  - Salisbury Cathedral begun in England.
  - Cluny Abbey's 3rd building campaign, initiated in 1080, is over. It is the world's largest religious building until the 16th century.
  - Upper three storeys of Qutb Minar in the Delhi Sultanate added.
- c.1220
  - Beauvais Cathedral begun.
  - Château de Coucy begun.
  - Gawdawpalin Temple finished in Bagan, Pagan Kingdom.
  - Cressing Temple Barley Barn in eastern England erected.
- 1221 – Burgos Cathedral begun.
- 1222 – Great Hall of Winchester Castle begun.
- 1227
  - Marienstatt Abbey church consecrated.
  - Toledo Cathedral begun.
  - Reconstruction of Toompea Castle begun.
- 1228
  - July 17 – The foundation stone of the Basilica of San Francesco d'Assisi (completed 1253) in Assisi, Italy is laid.
- 1229
  - Beverston Castle is completed in England.
  - St. Mary's Cathedral, Tallinn begun.
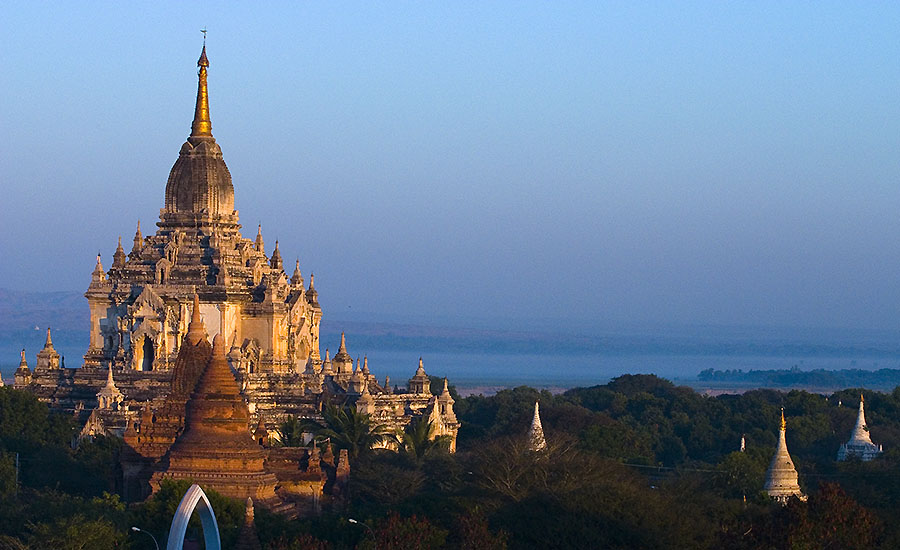
Gawdawpalin Temple, Bagan (c. 1220)

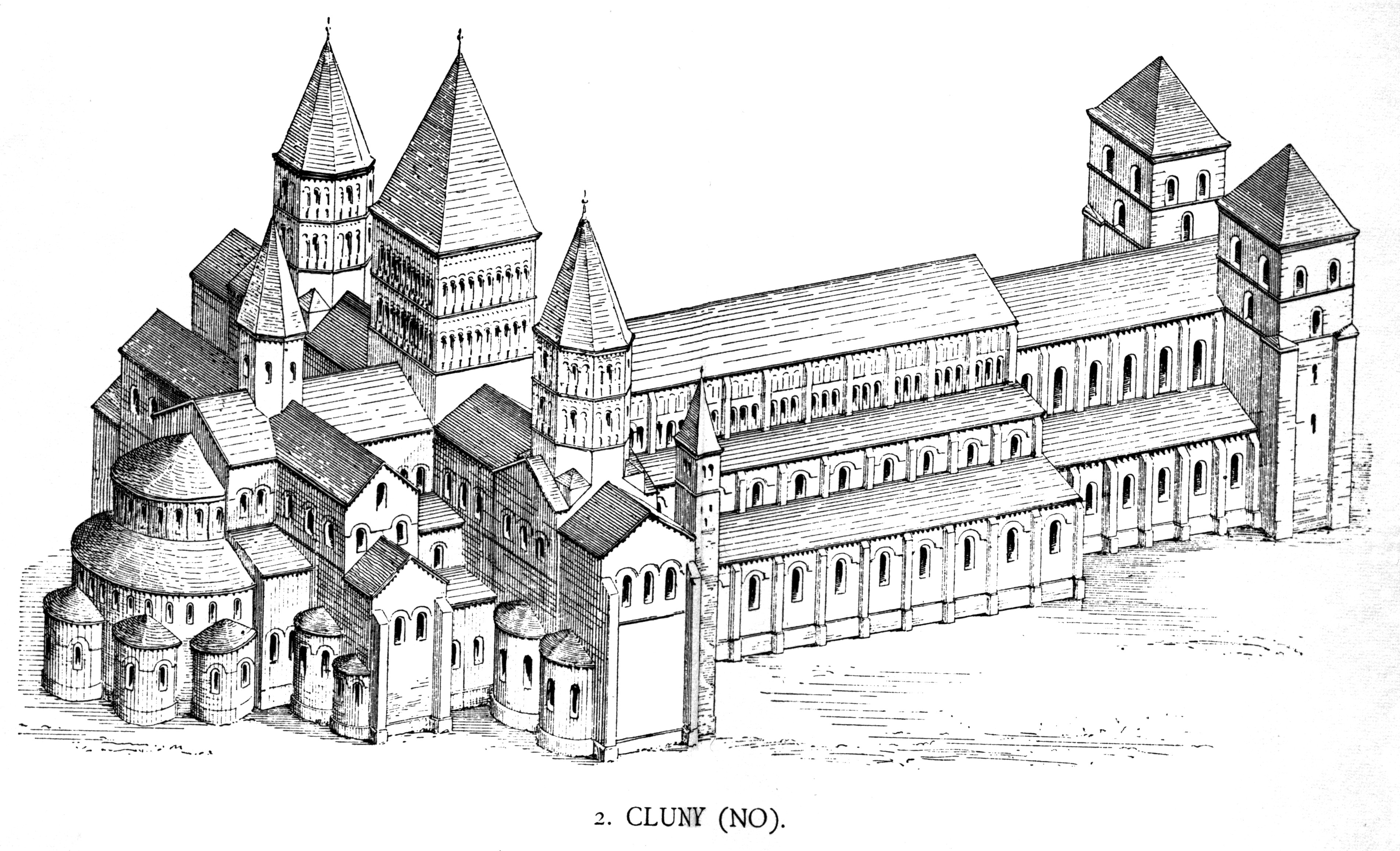
Cluny III Abbey reconstruction (1220)
