= Pagoda of Monk Wansong =

Pagoda in Beijing, China

Coordinates: 39.922°N 116.367°E

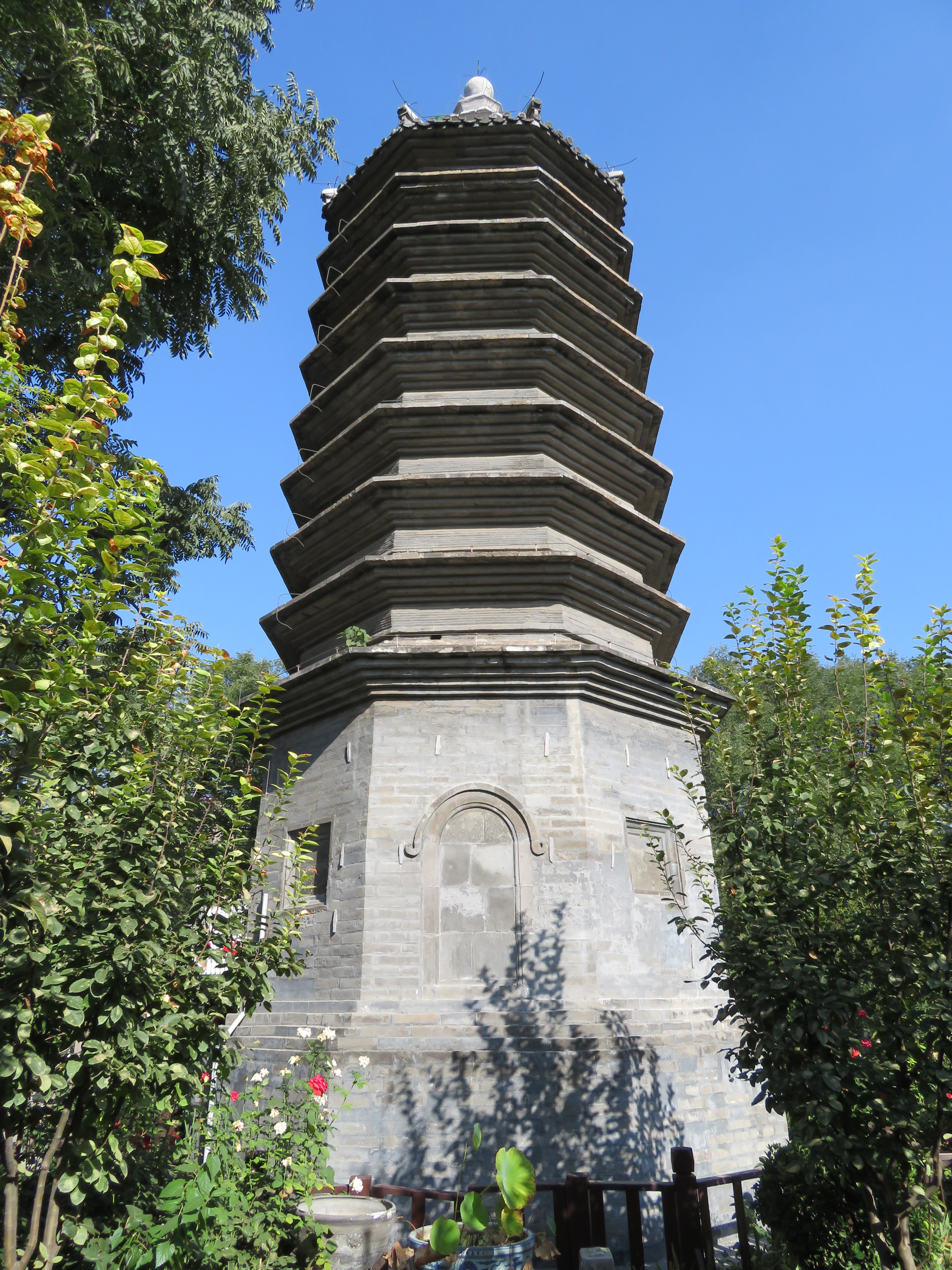
The Wansong Pagoda in Beijing

The Pagoda of Monk Wansong or Pagoda of the Old Man of Wansong (simplified Chinese: 万松老人塔; traditional Chinese: 萬松老人塔; pinyin: Wànsōng Lǎorén Tǎ) is a brick pagoda originally built during the mid 13th-century. It stands near the Xisi intersection in the Xicheng District of Beijing, China.

== History ==
The pagoda was a sepulchral pagoda for the famous Chan Buddhist monk Wansong Xingxiu (1166–1246), who lived under the Jin dynasty and Mongol Empire. He called himself the Old Man of Wansong ("ten thousand pine trees"), referring to the Ten Thousand Pine Trees studio where he once lived. After Wansong's death his disciples built a pagoda for his remains in the west of the former central capital of the Jin dynasty, then called Yanjing (modern Beijing).

The pagoda was octagonal in shape, with a flat top, and constructed from thin bricks. It was about 5 metres (16 ft) in height. On its front there was a stone plaque engraved with the words "Pagoda of the Old Man of Wansong" (萬松老人塔).

By the late Ming dynasty the pagoda had become hidden amongst the streets and buildings of the flourishing commercial city of Beijing, and it was not until a 1606 that a monk called Le'an (樂庵) noticed the overgrown pagoda, and raised money to repair it.

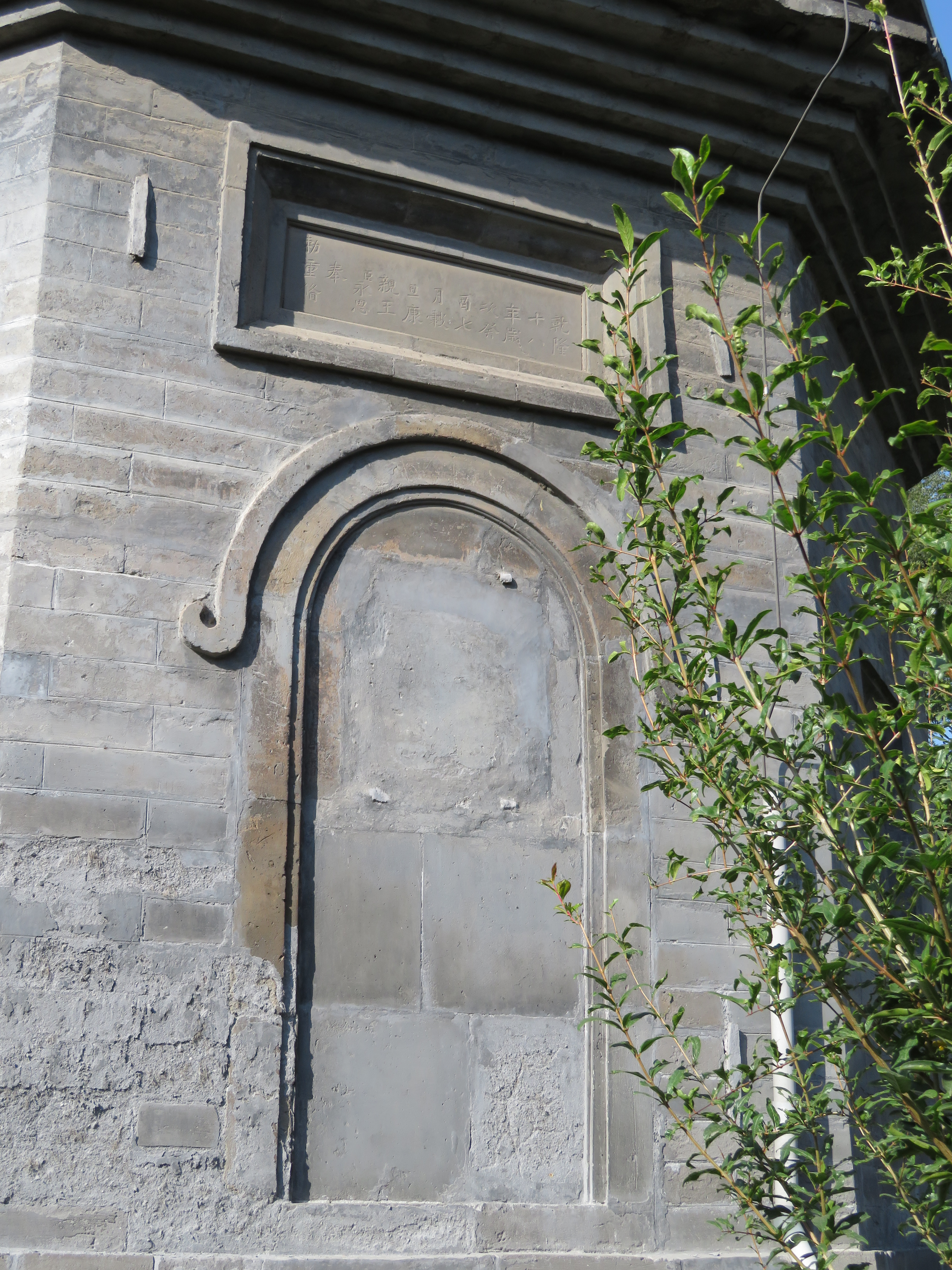
Commemorative inscription dated 1753 on south side of the pagoda

In 1753, during the Qing dynasty, the Qianlong Emperor ordered that the pagoda should be restored, and under direction of the Prince Kang (Aisin Gioro Yong'en 愛新覺羅･永恩) a new nine-storeyed octagonal brick pagoda was built around the original pagoda. The new pagoda was 15.9 metres (52 ft) in height, three times as tall as the original pagoda, and completely encased the smaller pagoda. An area of 99.3 square metres (1,069 sq ft) around the pagoda was set aside, and an inscription commemorating the pagoda's renovation was placed to the south of the pagoda.

In 1927 Ye Gongchuo 葉恭綽 (1881–1968), deputy minister of communications, led a campaign to restore the pagoda and the wall surrounding the grounds it stood in. Ye, who was also a famed calligrapher, wrote a new inscription "Yuan dynasty Pagoda of the Old Man of Wansong" (元萬松老人塔) on a stone tablet (Yuan dynasty is an anachronism as the dynasty was not founded until 1271, some time after the construction of the pagoda during the period of the Mongol Empire).

The pagoda was damaged by the Tangshan earthquake in 1976, when the tip of the pagoda fell to the ground, but it was soon restored to its position on top of the pagoda.

In 1986 the local Xicheng government paid for the restoration of the pagoda, and it was during this renovation that it was discovered that the original seven-storeyed octagonal brick pagoda was still intact inside the pagoda shell constructed around it in 1753. The bricks used for the original pagoda were thin bricks typical of the Yuan dynasty.

== Present situation ==
Until 2010 the pagoda was largely hidden by shops and residential buildings, but after redevelopment of the area for the construction of Xisi Underground Station and further restoration of the pagoda in 2013 the pagoda is open to the public. The pagoda is set in a courtyard, surrounded by pomegranate trees and roses. Bookshops specializing in Beijing history occupy the north and south sides of the courtyard, along with an exhibition room displaying artefacts and information relating to the history of the pagoda.
