= Ponts Couverts, Strasbourg =

Ponts Couverts
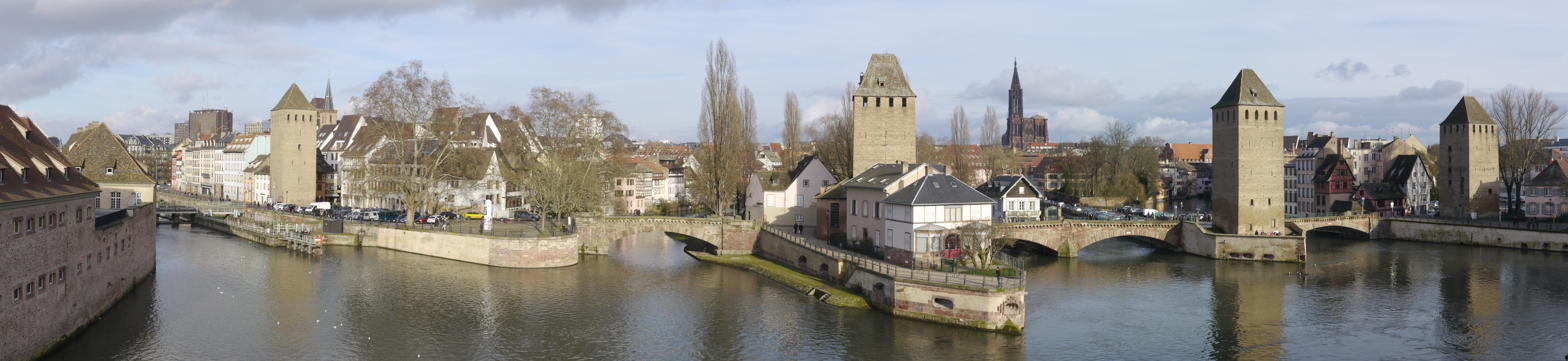
- The three bridges and four towers of the Ponts Couverts seen from the panoramic terrace of Barrage Vauban
- Coordinates: 48°34′48.4″N 7°44′21.6″E
- Crosses: River Ill
- Locale: Strasbourg, France

History
- Opened: 1250

Location
- Interactive map of Ponts Couverts

The Ponts Couverts (French pronunciation: [pɔ̃ kuvɛʁ]) are a set of three bridges and four towers that make up a defensive work erected in the 13th century on the River Ill in Strasbourg, France. The three bridges cross the four river channels of the Ill that flow through Strasbourg's historic Petite France quarter. The Ponts Couverts have been classified as a Monument historique since 1928.

Construction of the Ponts Couverts commenced in 1230, and they were opened in 1250. As a defensive mechanism, they were superseded by the Barrage Vauban, just upstream, in 1690, but remained in use as bridges. As built, each of the bridges was covered by a wooden roof that served to protect the defenders who would have been stationed on them in time of war. These roofs were removed in 1784, but the name Ponts Couverts (covered bridges) has remained in common use ever since.

== Gallery ==
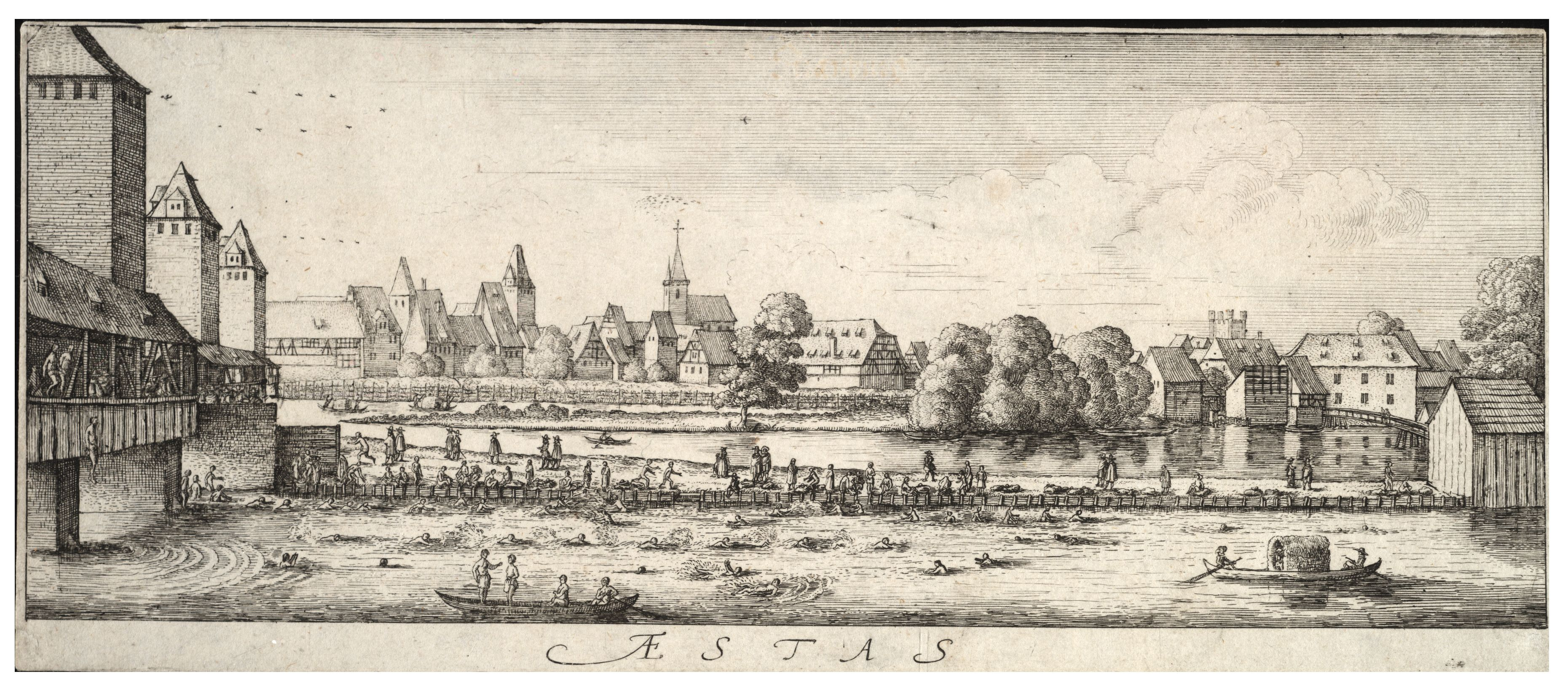
Seen in ca. 1650 by Wenceslaus Hollar

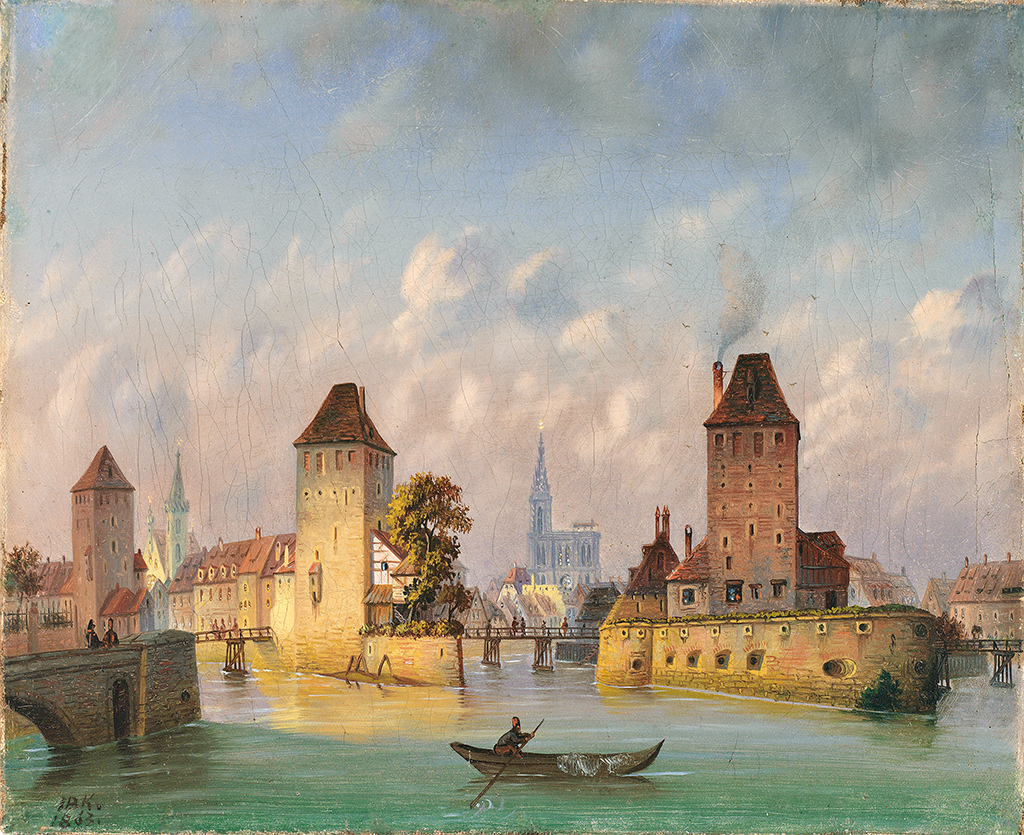
Seen in 1863 by Johann Baptist Kreitmayer (1819–1879)

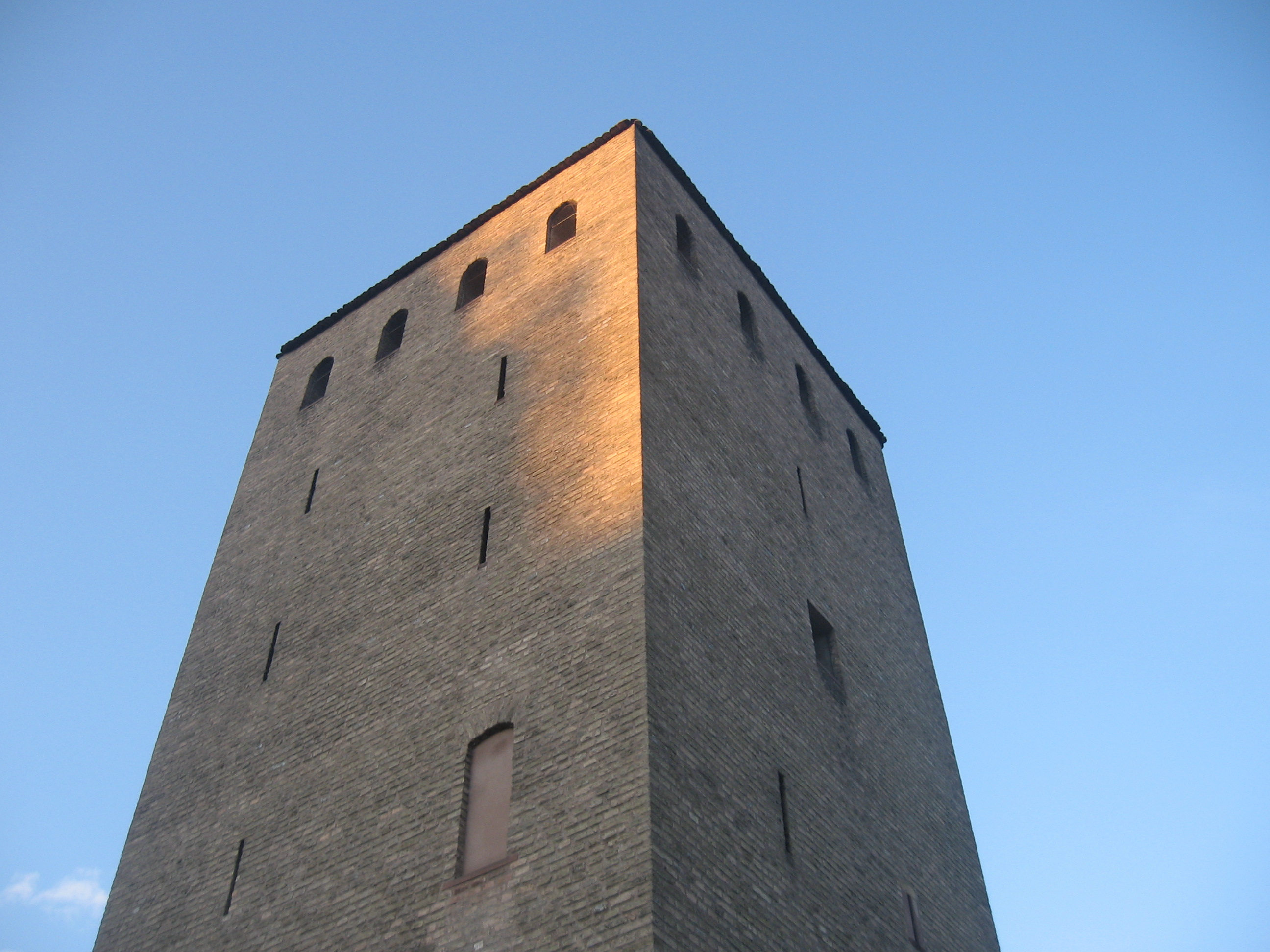
Close-up of a tower

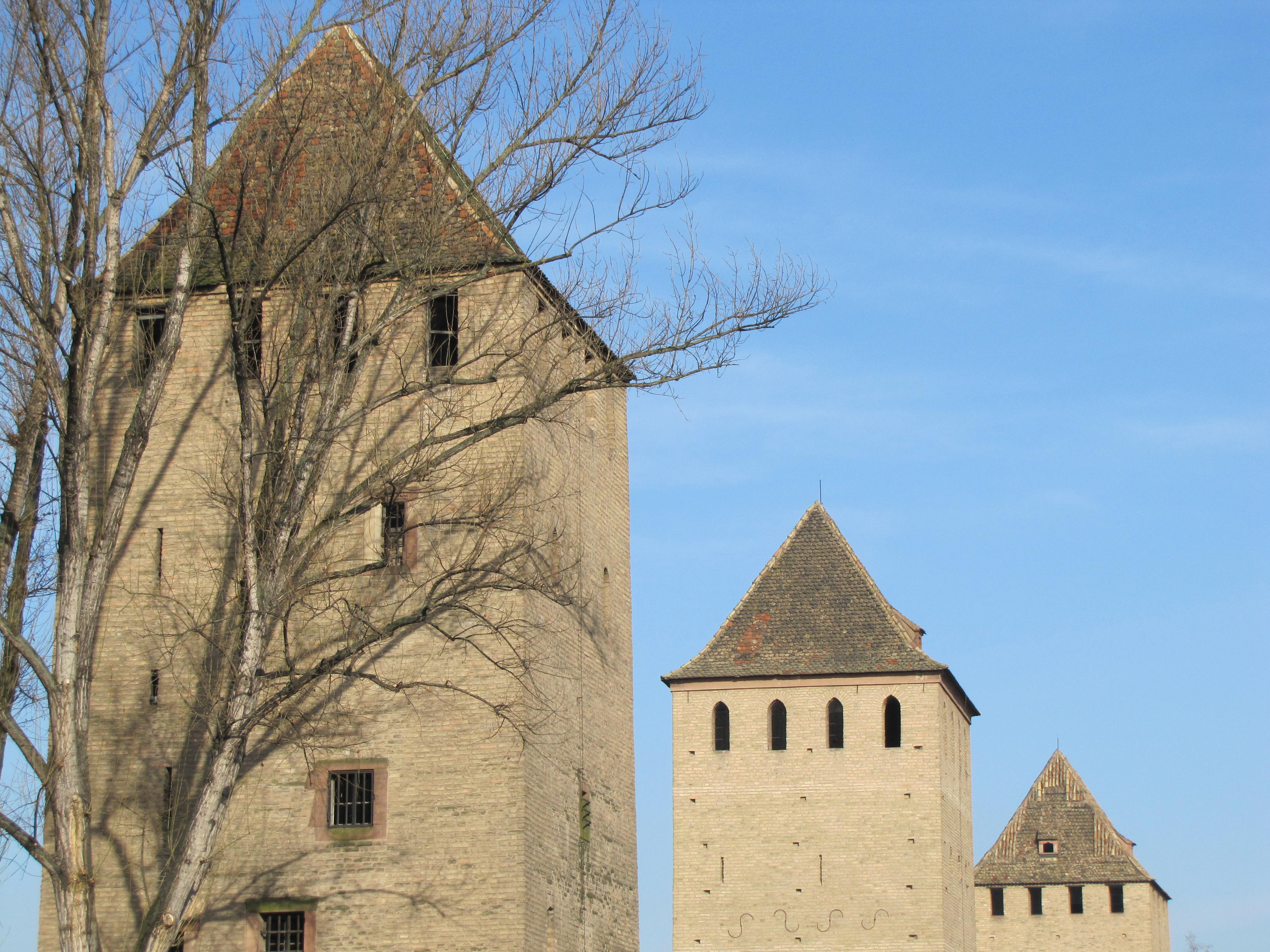
Three towers aligned

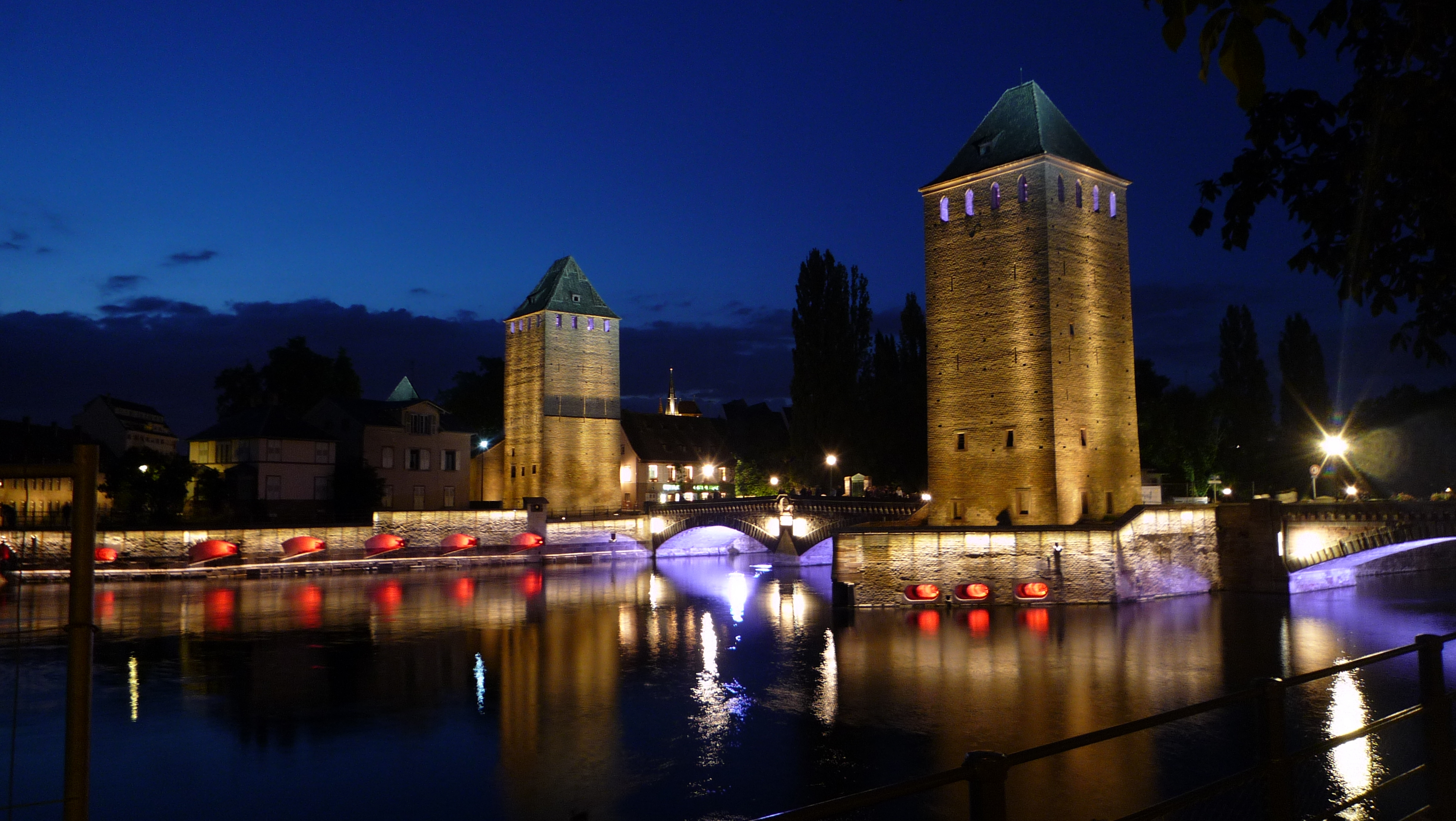
The Ponts Couverts by night

The Ponts Couverts covered in snow as seen from Barrage Vauban
