= Jacques Lepautre =

French engraver

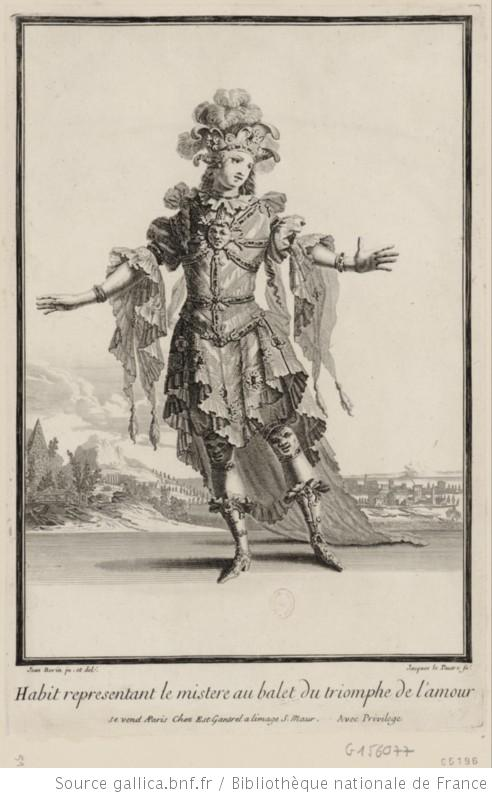
Costume for the ballet Le triomphe de l'amour, music by Jean-Baptiste Lully, first performed on 21 January 1681 at the Château de Saint-Germain-en-Laye, engraving by Jacques Lepautre after a design by Jean Bérain

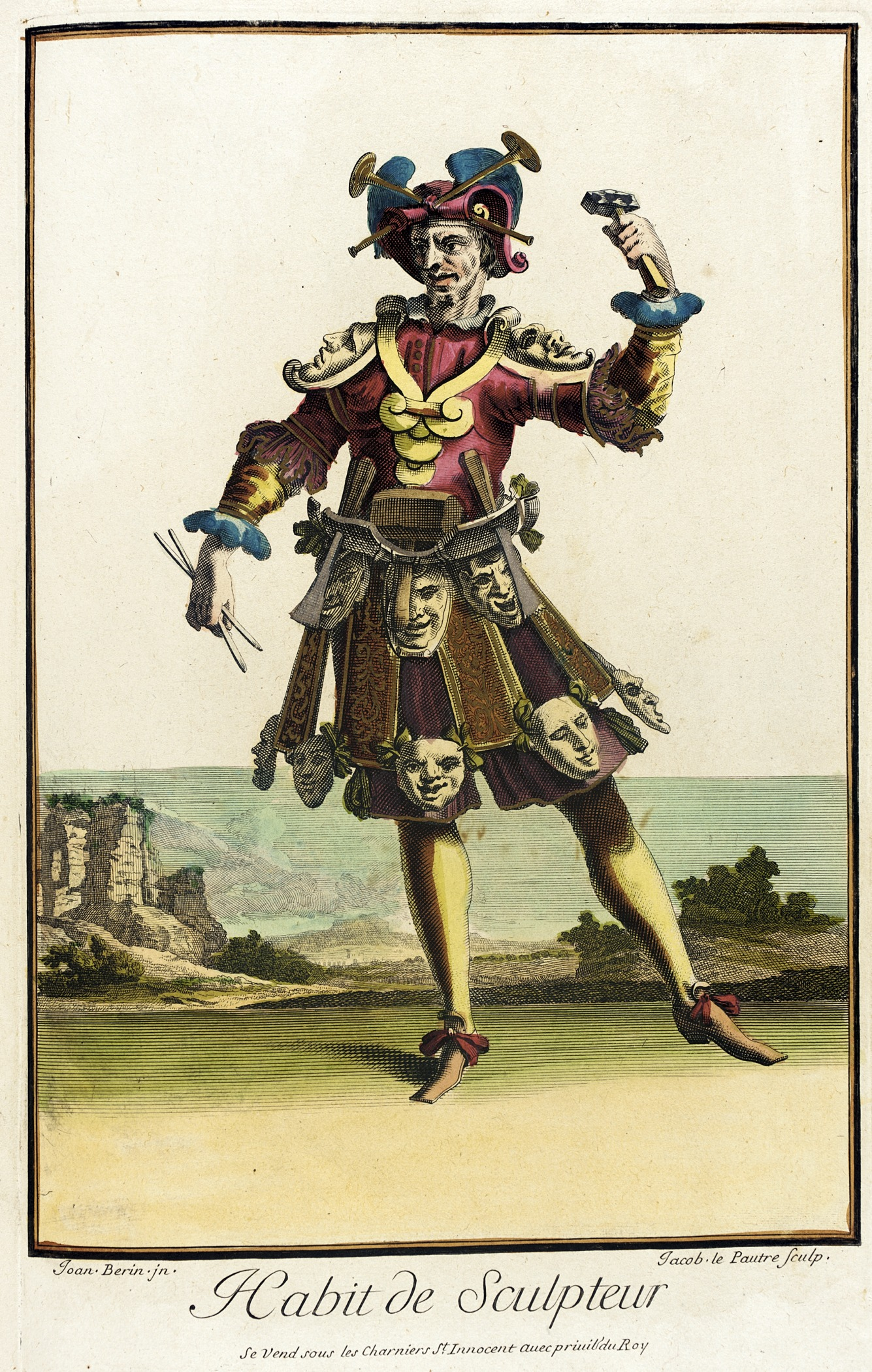
Habit de Sculpteur, engraving by Jacques Lepautre after a design by Jean Bérain, c. 1680s, from the Recueil des modes de la cour de France (LACMA)

Jacques Lepautre or Le Pautre (c. 1653 – 1684) was a Parisian engraver active during the last quarter of the seventeenth century. Jacques was the son of the prolific printmaker Jean Lepautre (1618–1682) and nephew of architect Antoine Lepautre (1621–1679).

Jacques's oeuvre (body of work) is significantly smaller than that of his father's: according to the Bibliothèque Nationale de France’s Inventaire du fonds français entry on the Lepautre family, the BNF’s Cabinet des estampes et de la photographie possesses fifty-eight works attributed to Jacques Lepautre.

Lepautre is primarily known for his engravings after drawings of ballet and mascarade costume designs by Jean Bérain. These prints, like those by contemporary printmakers like Jean Dolivar (1641-1692) and others, present single characters positioned in the foreground of a shallow space, posed to display elegant and often extravagant costumes.

Inscriptions on the surviving prints indicate that Lepautre’s works were issued not only from his father’s shop ("sous les Charniers St. Innocent") but also from Etienne Gantrel's L’Image St Maur and Nicolas Bonnart's L’Aigle Noir.

Many of Lepautre's prints can be found in the BNF's extensive multi-volume Collection Hennin. In the US, the Los Angeles County Museum of Art's album of prints the Recueil des modes de la cour de France includes a hand-painted set of Lepautre's engravings.
