= Pierre Lepautre =

Pierre Lepautre may refer to:

- Pierre Lepautre (1648–1716), French engraver, who played a role in the development of rococo
- Pierre Lepautre (1659–1744), French sculptor
