= Hôtel d'Estrées =

Coordinates: 48.8554°N 2.3227°E

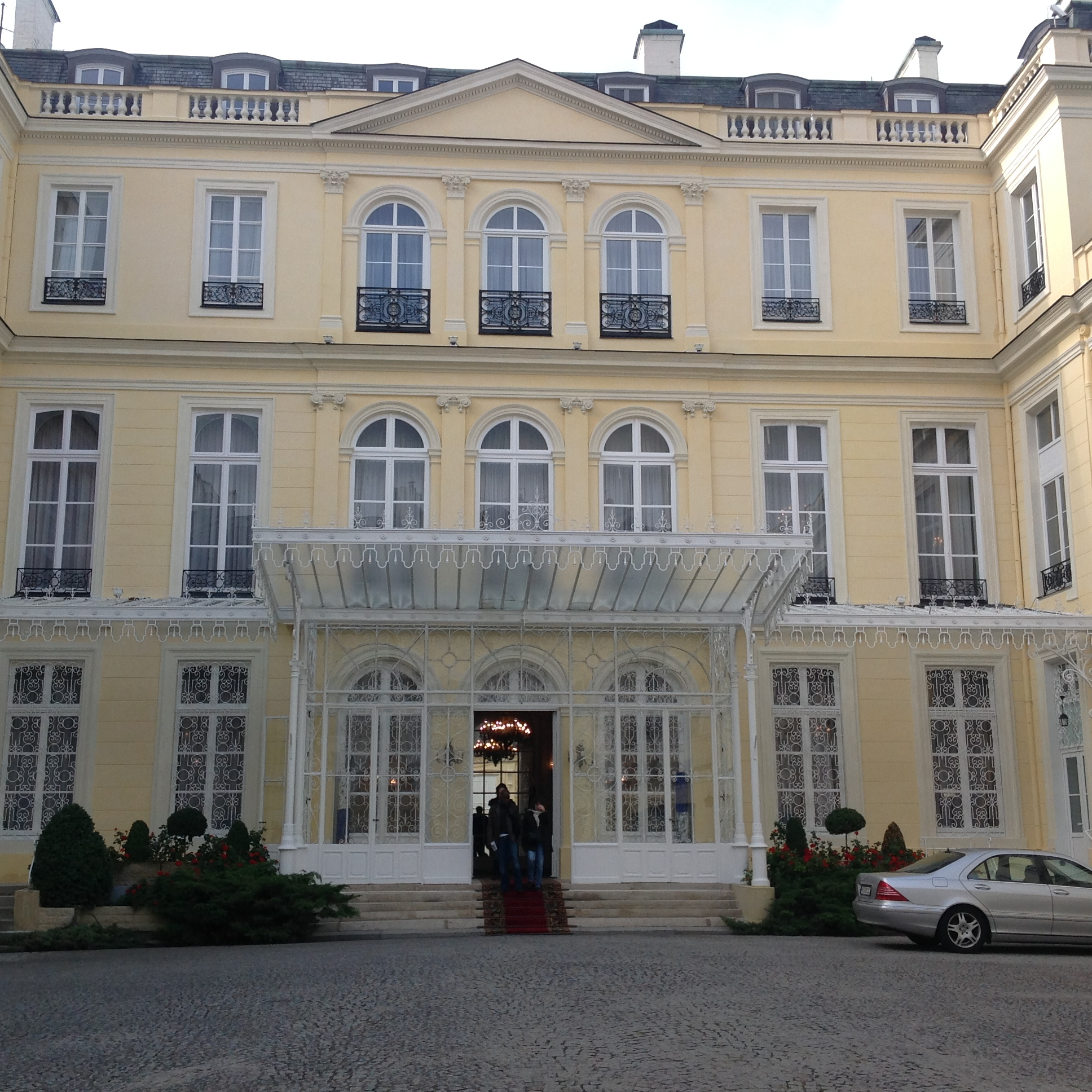
- Façade and courtyard of the Hôtel d'Estrées

General information
- Type: Hôtel particulier
- Location: Paris, France
- Construction started: 1711
- Completed: 1713

Design and construction
- Architect: Robert de Cotte

The Hôtel d'Estrées (French pronunciation: [otɛl dɛstʁe]) is an hôtel particulier, a type of large townhouse in France, at 79 rue de Grenelle in the 7th arrondissement of Paris. It is the official residence of the Ambassador of the Russian Federation to France. It was designed by Robert de Cotte, architect of King Louis XIV, and built between 1711 and 1713 for Madeleine-Diane de Bautru de Vaubrun, the Duchesse d'Estrées (1668–1753).

After belonging to several owners, it was purchased by the Russian government in 1863 and became the Russian embassy. Both Emperor Alexander II and his grandson, Nicholas II, stayed in the residence when they visited Paris. In 1977 the Russian embassy was moved to another building, and the hôtel became the residence of the Russian ambassador. It is now classified as a historic monument of France.

== History ==
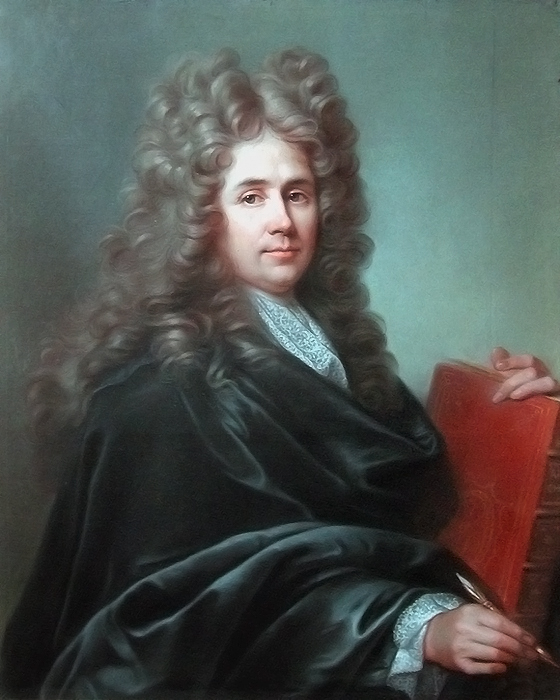
Robert de Cotte, first architect of the King and designer of the house

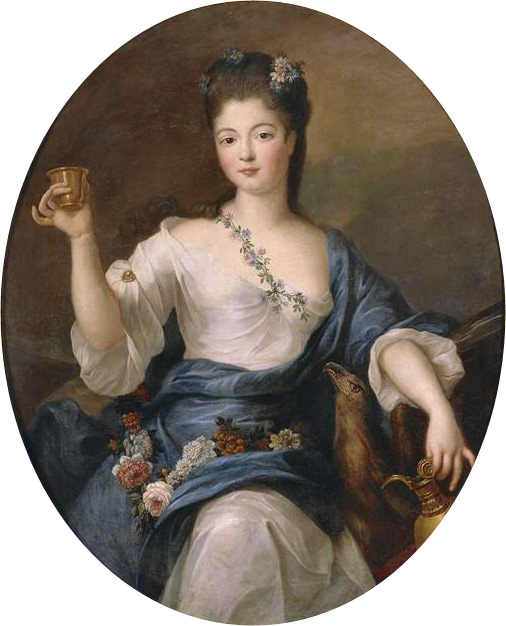
Charlotte Aglaé d’Orléans, duchess of Modena, resident from 1753 to 1761

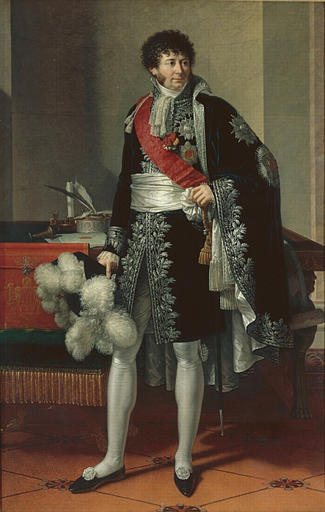
Henri Jacques Guillaume Clarke, Napoleon's Minister of War, owner from 1808 to 1818

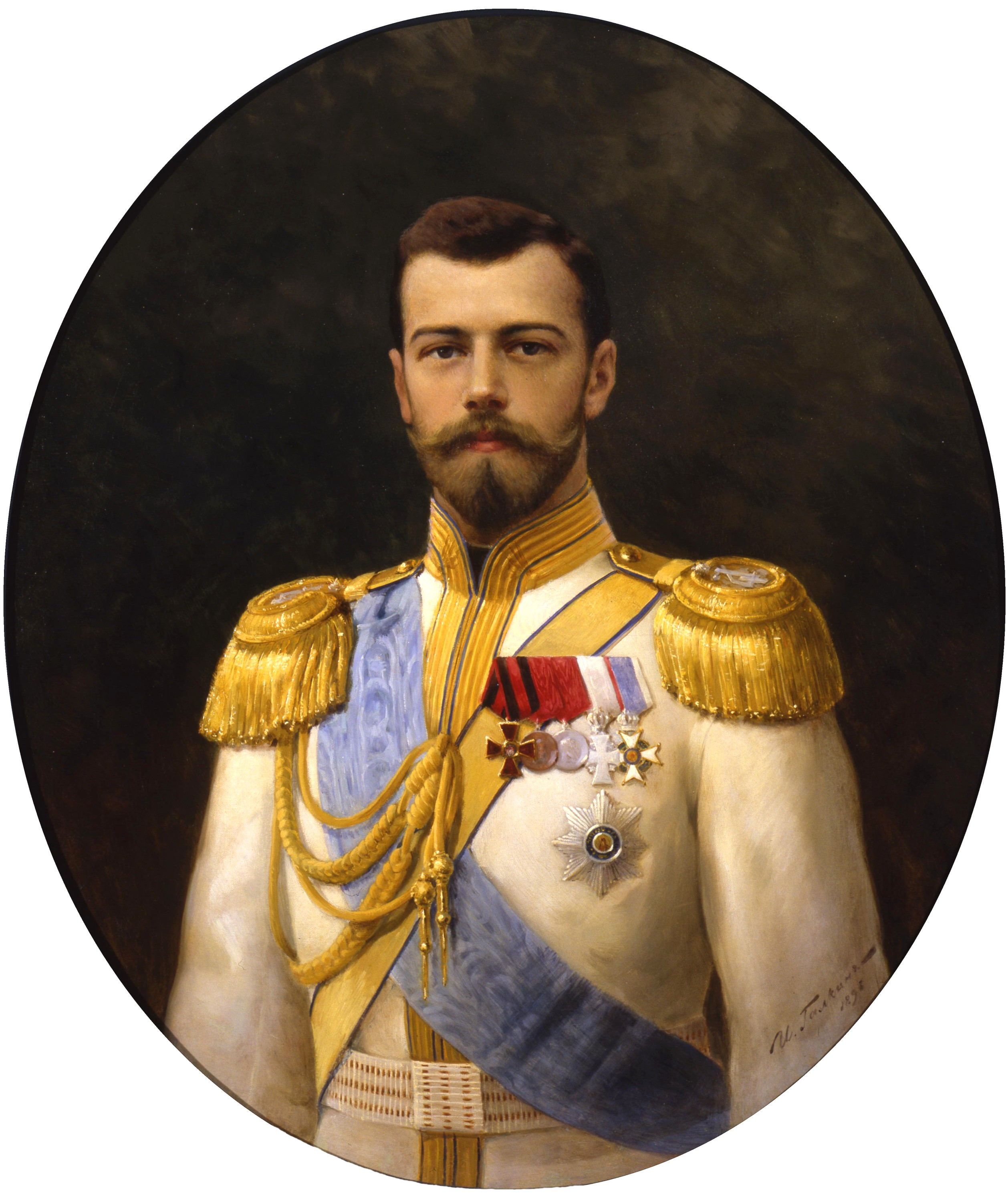
Nicholas II in 1896, the year of his visit to Paris

=== From Louis XIV to the Revolution ===
The Hôtel d'Estrées was designed by the architect Robert de Cotte (1656–1735), and was built between 1711 and 1713 for Madeleine-Diane de Bautru de Vaubrun, the duchess of Estrées. Robert De Cotte was the brother-in-law of Jules Hardouin-Mansard, and when Mansard died in 1708, de Cotte succeeded him as the chief architect (premier architect) of the King. De Cotte's other notable buildings in Paris included the Caserne des Mousquetaires noire (1710), at 26–28 rue Charenton (12th arrondissement); the Abbey of Saint Denis, the Royal Library (later the Bibliothèque nationale, site Richelieu) at 58 rue de Richelieu, which was finished by his son in 1727; and the facade of the Église Saint-Roch on rue Saint-Honoré, also finished after his death.

Following the death of the Duchess in 1753, her nephew, Louis-Antoine de Contaut-Biron, sold the house to Charlotte-Aglaé d'Orleans, the daughter of Philippe II, Duke of Orléans, the grandson of King Louis XIII and the Regent for King Louis XV until he reached maturity. After her death in 1761, the house was purchased by Anne-Françoise d'Harcourt, the marquis of Beuvon. His family lived in the house until the French Revolution.

=== From the French Revolution to 1917 ===
During the French Revolution, the house was seized by the revolutionary government and sold to Henri Jacques Guillaume Clarke, an Irish-born French soldier and politician who became a Marshal of France, the Duc de Feltre, and Napoleon's Minister of War from 1808 until his downfall in 1815. After his death in 1818, it became the residence of the Comte de Montesquiou, the former President of the National Assembly. He in turn sold it in 1823 to the Duchesse de Tourzel.

In 1863, during the Second Empire of Napoleon III, the descendants of the Duchesse de Tourzel sold the house to the Imperial Russian government, represented by Ambassador Baron André de Boudberg. Following the purchase, the Russian government made extensive changes to the house. Several salons on the ground floor were made into the apartment of the Ambassador, while the central salon became his office. A large part of the original wall panelling of the original salons, dating to the 18th century, was preserved. More extensive renovations were carried out on the first floor, where the salons were made into reception rooms. The old walls were removed and the decor redone in the Second Empire style. The transformation of the house was completed in 1867.

A few months after the completion of the work, Emperor Alexander II of Russia came to Paris to visit the Universal Exposition of 1867, and welcomed Napoleon III and Empress Eugenie at a reception in the house. In 1896, his grandson, the newly-crowned Emperior Nicholas II, came to Paris with his wife Alexandra. They stayed for three days, during which the house briefly became the imperial Palace. During his visit he laid the first stone for the Pont Alexandre III, named for his father.

=== After the Russian Revolution ===
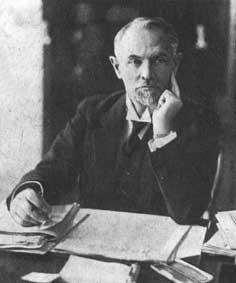
Leonid Krasin, first Soviet ambassador to France (1924)

Following the first phase of the Russian Revolution in March 1917, the house was occupied for a time by Vasily Maklakov, the Ambassador of the provisional Russian government to France. After the Bolshevik seizure of power in November 1917, France and Russia broke off diplomatic relations, and the house was occupied by representatives of the anti-Bolshevik white Russians in France, and served as their informal headquarters.

In October 1924, the French government of Édouard Herriot formally recognized the Soviet Union, and in December, 1930, the first Soviet ambassador to France, Leonid Krasin, took up residence in the house. During the Second World War, the building was occupied by the Germans.

In 1977, a new chancellery for the Embassy was completed in the 16th Arrondissement, and most Embassy offices moved there. The new building was inaugurated in by Leonid Brezhnev, General Secretary of the Central Committee of the Communist Party of the Soviet Union. In 1978 the Hôtel d'Estrées was closed for four years of extensive renovation, which restored the building to its appearance during the 19th century. When the work was completed in 1982, it became the residence of the Ambassador.

== The ground floor ==
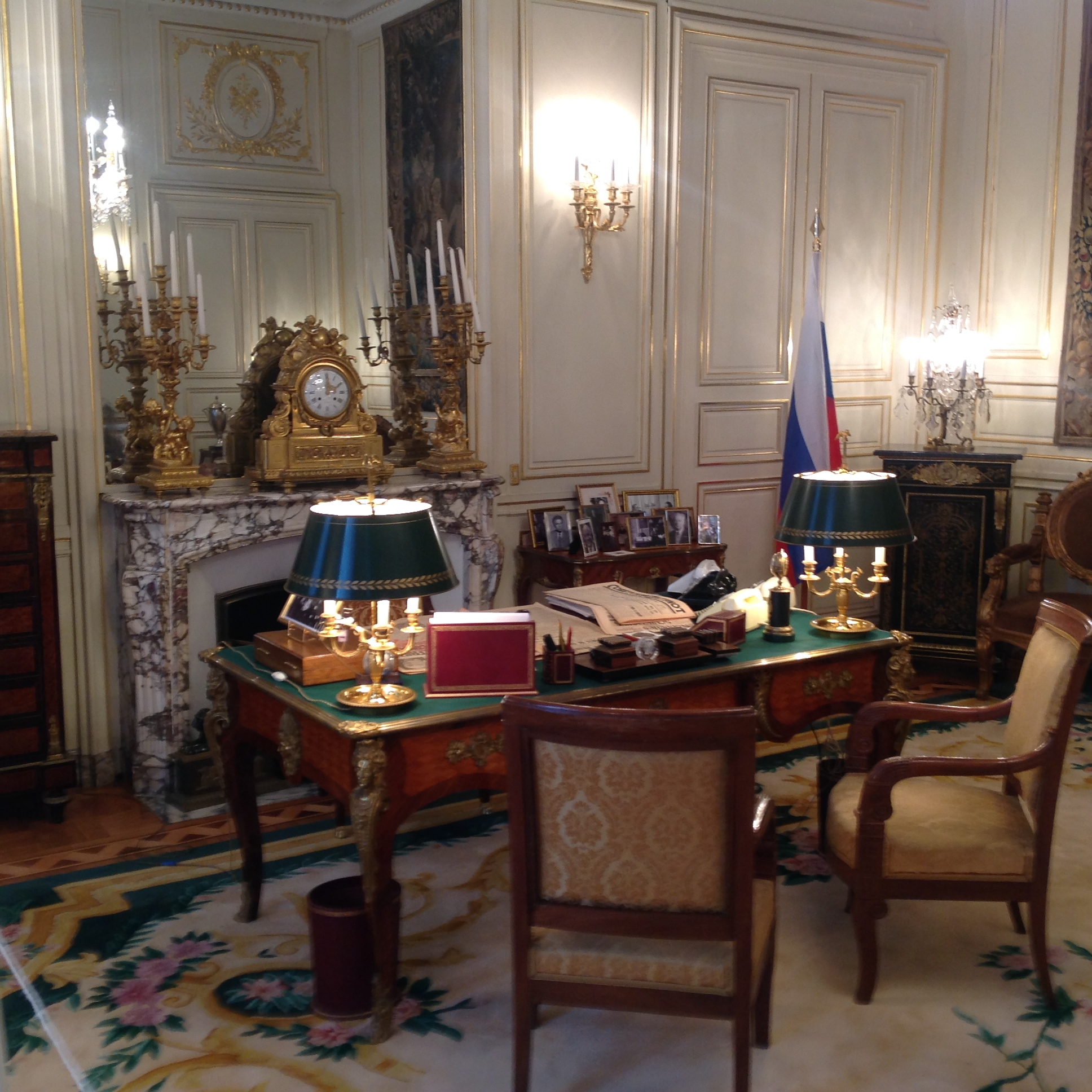
Ambassador's office, as it was in 1924

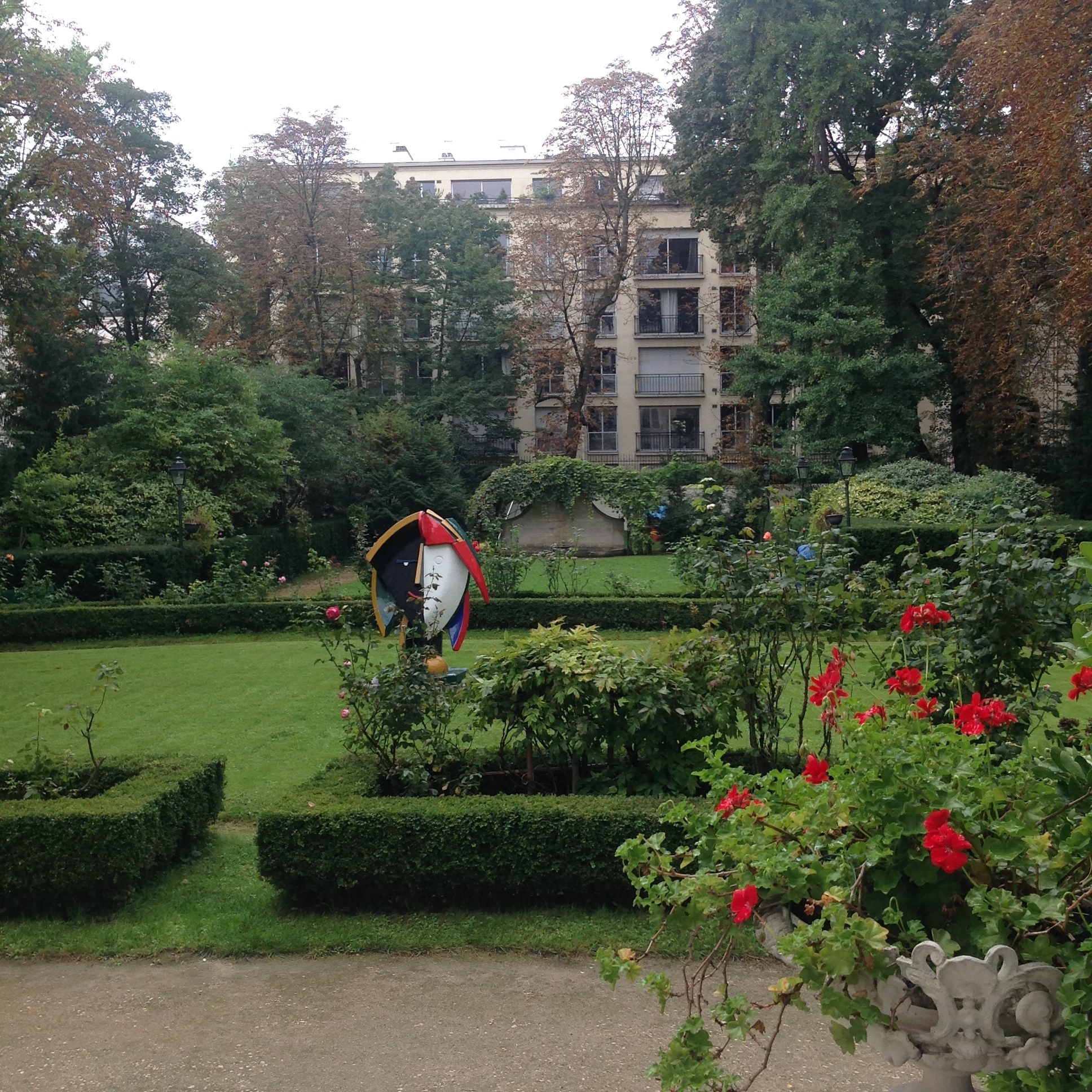
The garden, with a work of contemporary sculpture

The ground floor of the building preserves many elements of the decoration of the house from the 18th century, while the upper floor was extensively remodeled into the style of the Second Empire. The ground floor was used as the imperial apartments during the visit of Nicholas II and Empress Alexandra in October 1896.

The entrance of the building leads from the courtyard into the grand vestibule. inside the door is a bust of Emperor Alexander II by the contemporary Russian sculptor, Alexander Bourganov. on the walls are bronze plaques with the names of all Russian Ambassadors to France since 1701. In the corridor leading to the grand stairway are portraits of three other Russian sovereigns; Peter the Great, Nicholas I of Russia and Alexander II of Russia.

The gray salon preserves the wood panelling from the 18th century. Over the doors are grisaille paintings of putti, in various human activities.

The next room is he Ambassador’s office, decorated as it was in 1924. The desk is the original one used by Ambassadors since that date. On the wall is a Flemish tapestry from the 17th century, “the Hunt”. The office has three large windows looking out onto the garden.

The white salon, next to the office, was used as the bed chamber by Nicholas II and Alexandra.

Behind the building is the garden, decorated with flowerbeds and trees. In recent years it has been used to display works of sculptor by contemporary Russian artists.

== The first floor ==
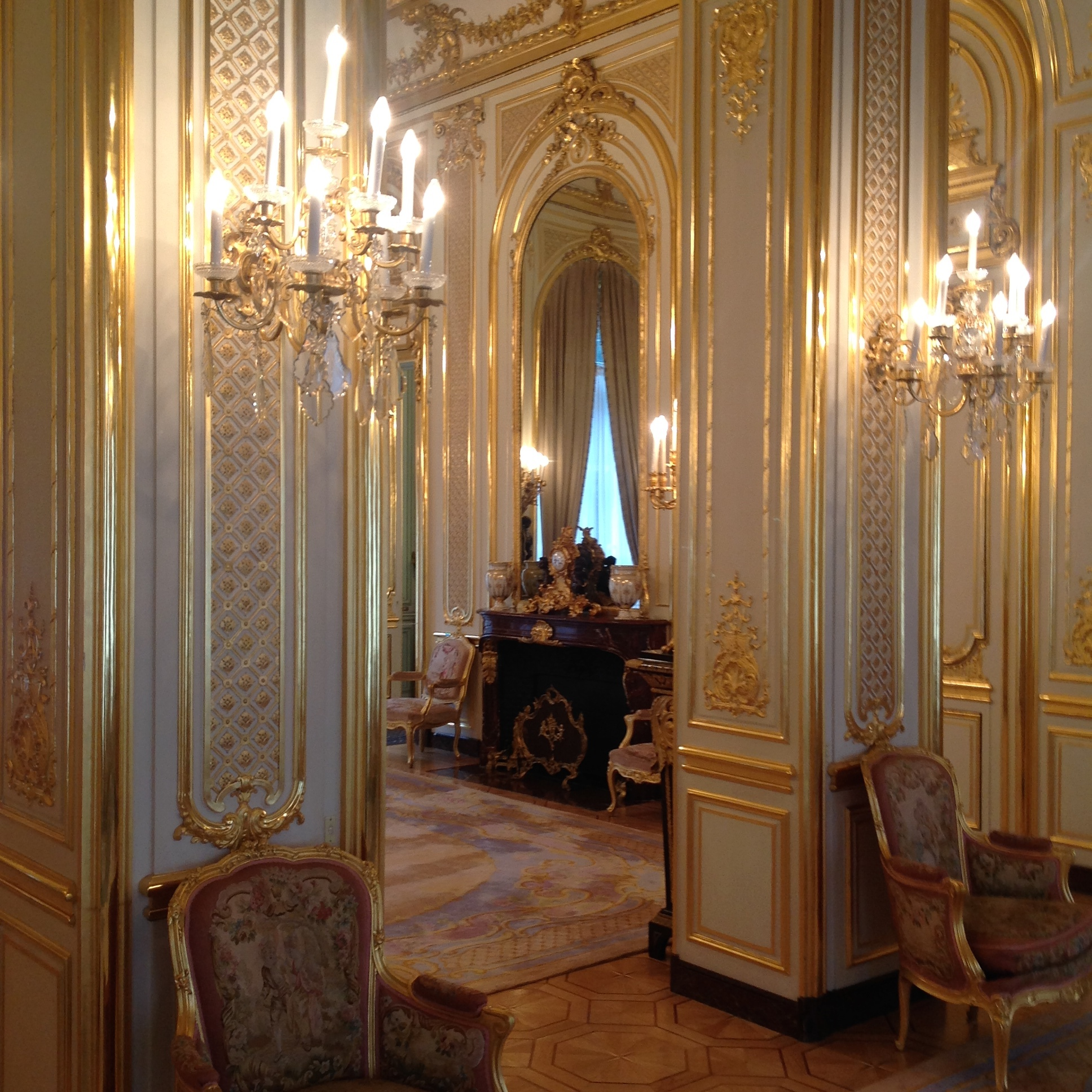
The Salon Doré

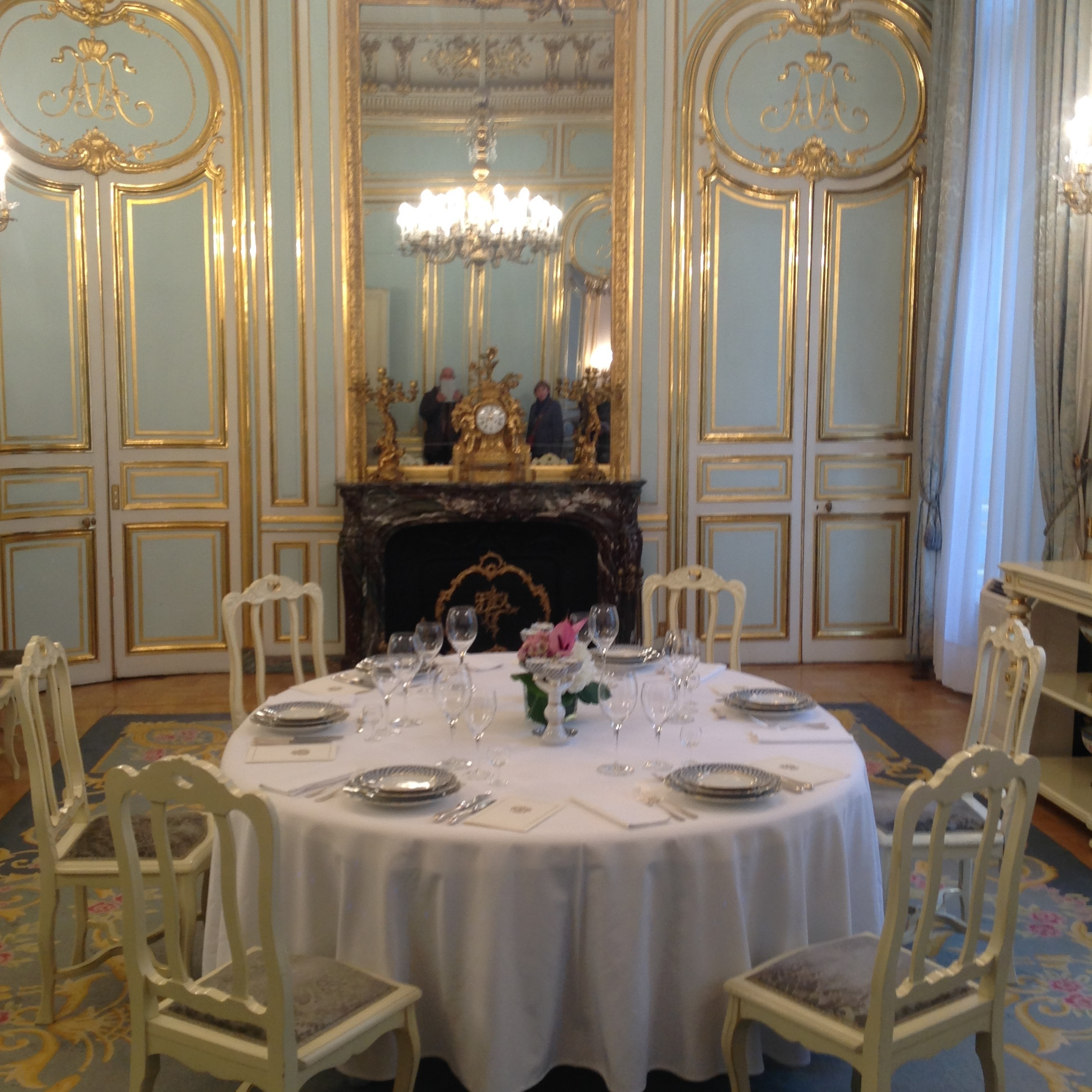
The Blue Salon

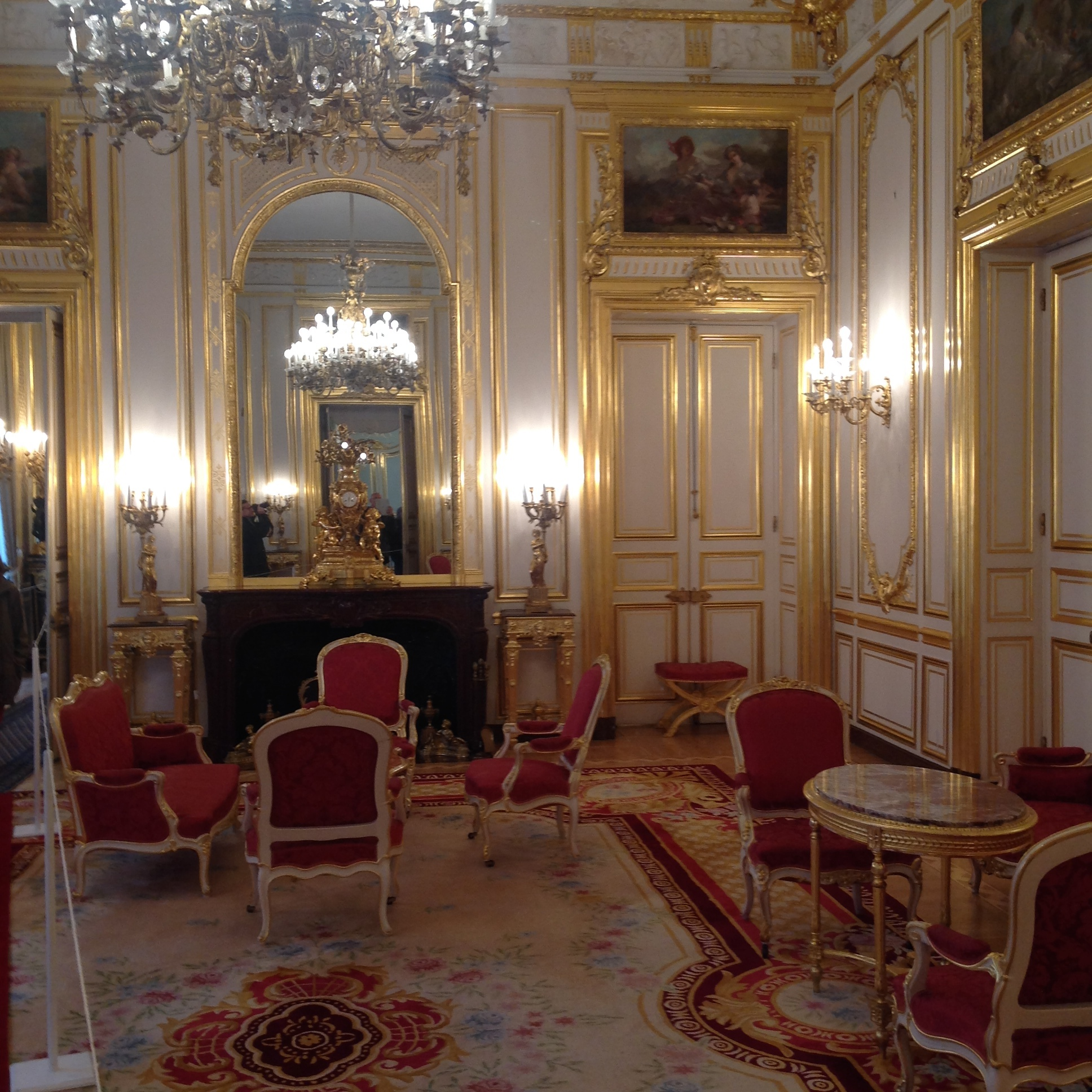
Red Salon

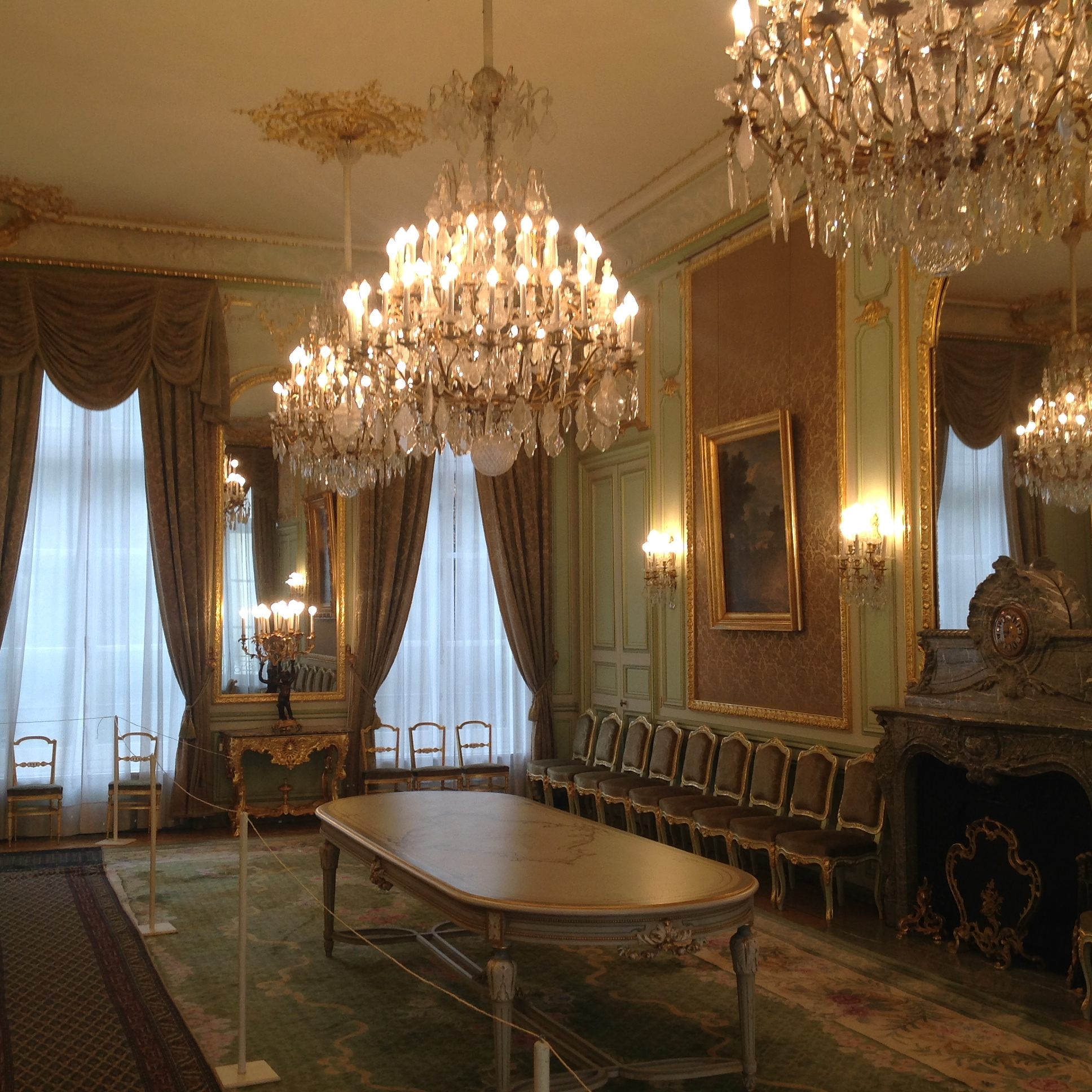
The Green Salon

The grand stairway, fade of marble with three landing, connects the ground floor with the “etage noble”, or first floor. It dates to 1713, when the house was built. The stairway is decorated with a large tapestry, “The Triumph of Alexander”, made in Brussels in the 18th century after a painting by Charles Le Brun, the court painter of Louis XIV.

The small antechamber at the top of the stairway has the original panelling 18th century, with the coat of arms of the Dukes of Harcourt.

The antechamber opens onto the Gold Salon, the former Salon d’Honneur. The doors, walls and cornices are gilded with gold leaf, and the architecture includes four columns with Corinthian capitals. Over the doors are illustrations from the fables of La Fontaine.

Next to the Gold Salon is the Green Salon, which was the dining room for the ambassadors of Imperial Russia. It contains Russian paintings from the 19th century, including “The Mirage” by the Russian-Armenian marine painter Ivan Aivazovsky representing a vision of Constantinople.

The antechamber also opens onto the Red Salon, which was used for official ceremonies, and was used as the throne room by Nicholas II during his visit to Paris. The furniture is in the Louis XV style, and includes a clock from that period by Lerolle and Freres, Paris, placed on a red granite chimney. The decoration over the doors dates to the first owners of the house, and represents scenes of court life.

The Red Salon leads to the Bleu Salon, an oval room with a light blue color which serves as a dining room for the Ambassador for official functions. The room had been transformed into a throne room for the planned visit of Alexander III which never took place, and was decorated with the monograms of the Emperor, while the cornices were decorated with the Imperial coats of arms. During the visit of Nicholas II, the room was used as his private office.

== Art ==
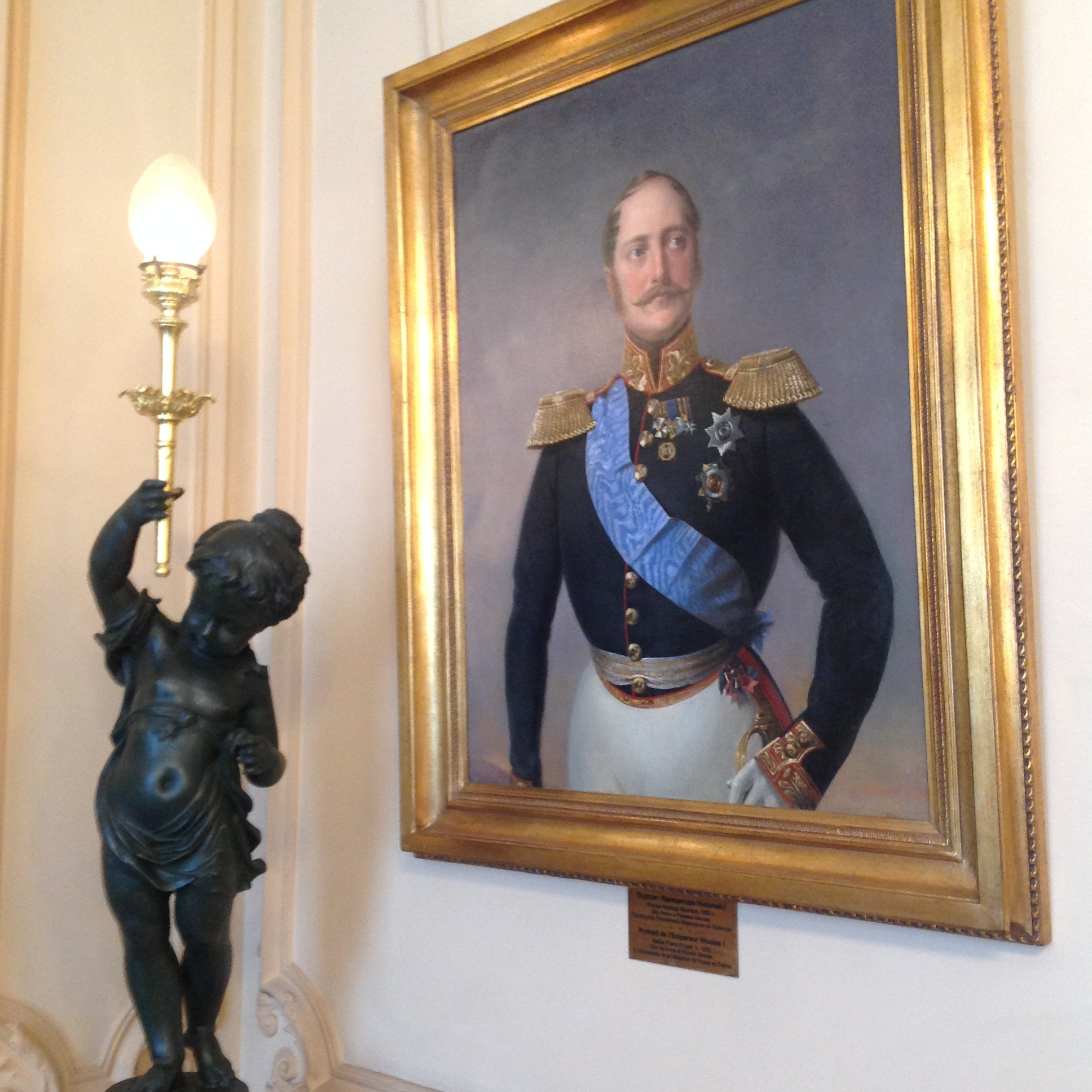
Portrait of Czar Nicholas I of Russia (19th century)

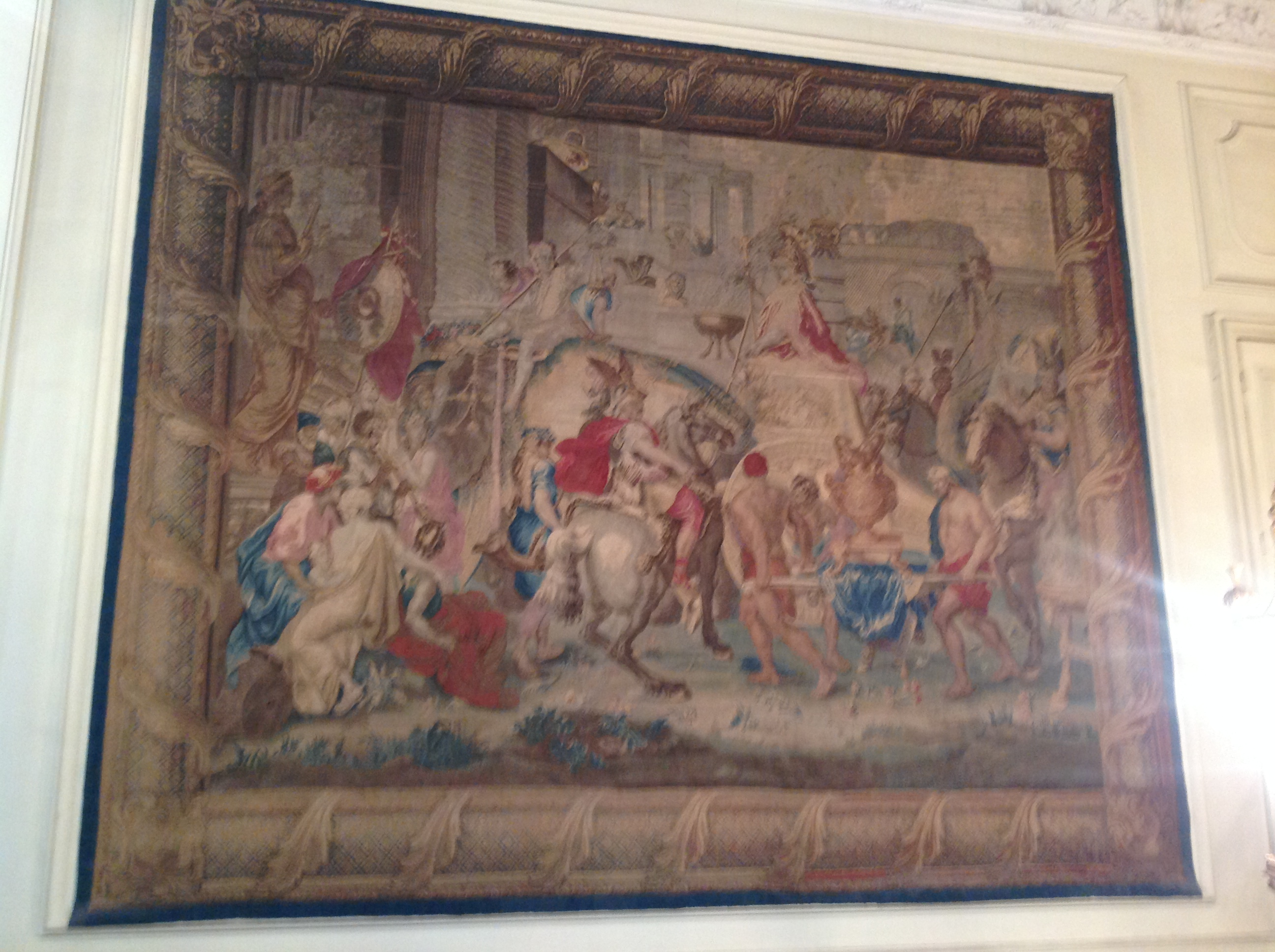
"Triumph of Alexander" tapestry on grand stairway (Brussels, 18th century)

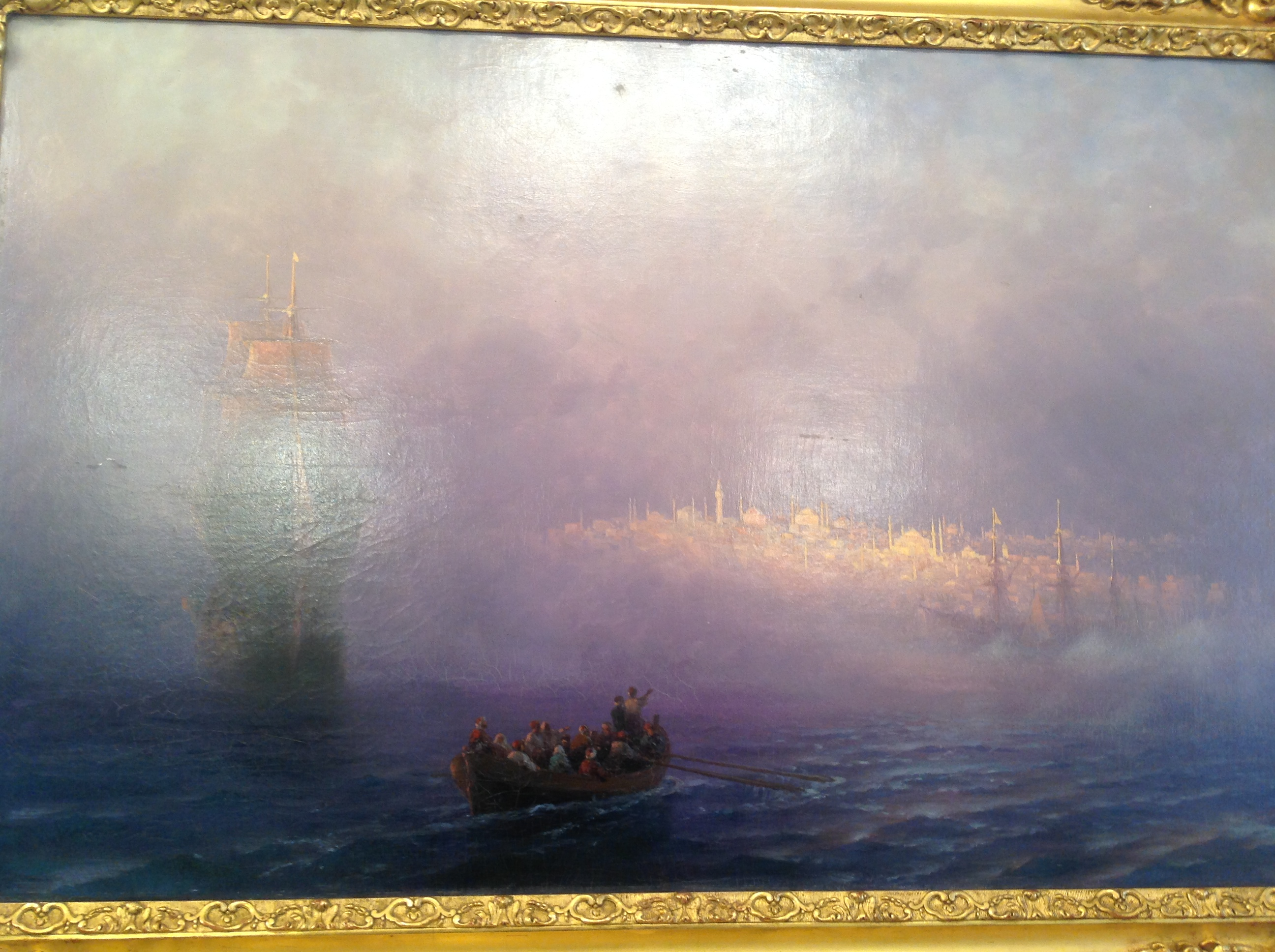
"The Mirage" by Ivan Aivazovsky

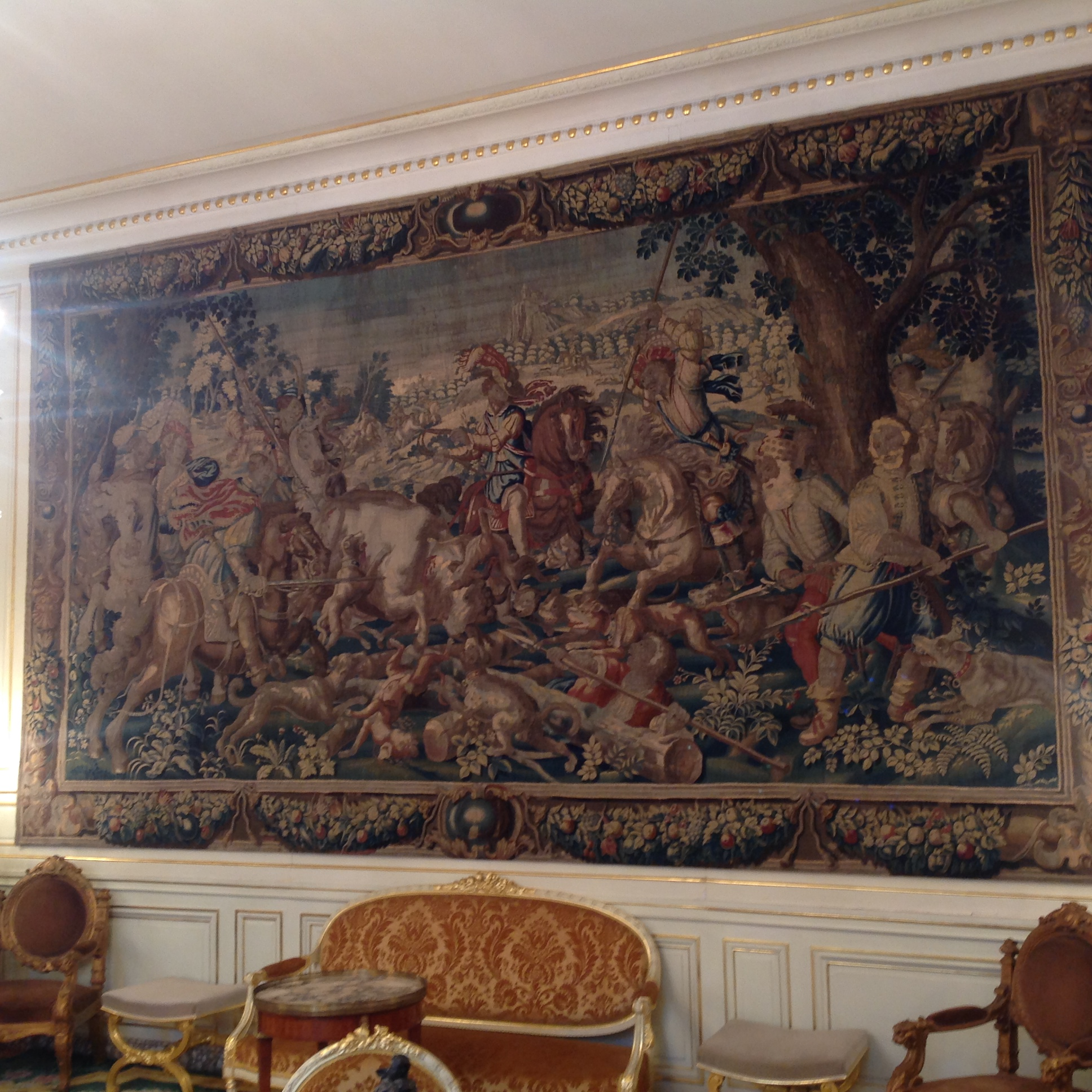
"The Hunt" Tapestry, Flemish, 17th century, in the Ambassador's office
