= Jules-Robert de Cotte =

French architect (1683–1767)

Jules-Robert de Cotte (1683–1767) was a renowned French architect, the son of one of the most highly regarded architect-administrators of his era, Robert de Cotte.

The younger de Cotte assisted his father in the most prestigious architectural project in France, the building works at the royal palaces, (Bâtiments du Roi). In 1718, he received, in the course of construction, one of the three posts of "intendant et ordonnateur"

In 1723, top German architect Balthasar Neumann came to Paris in order to study the latest French stylistic developments of the emerging Rococo and consulted Robert de Cotte, as well as Jules-Robert, whose reputation with Neumann was as good as his father and surpassing that of another brilliant contemporary French architect, Germain Boffrand, an assessment that modern art historians would not support. Following in his father's footsteps, Jules-Robert de Cotte relied on workshop assistants to provide the details for his commissions.
