= Pierre Lepautre (engraver) =

French engraver and architect

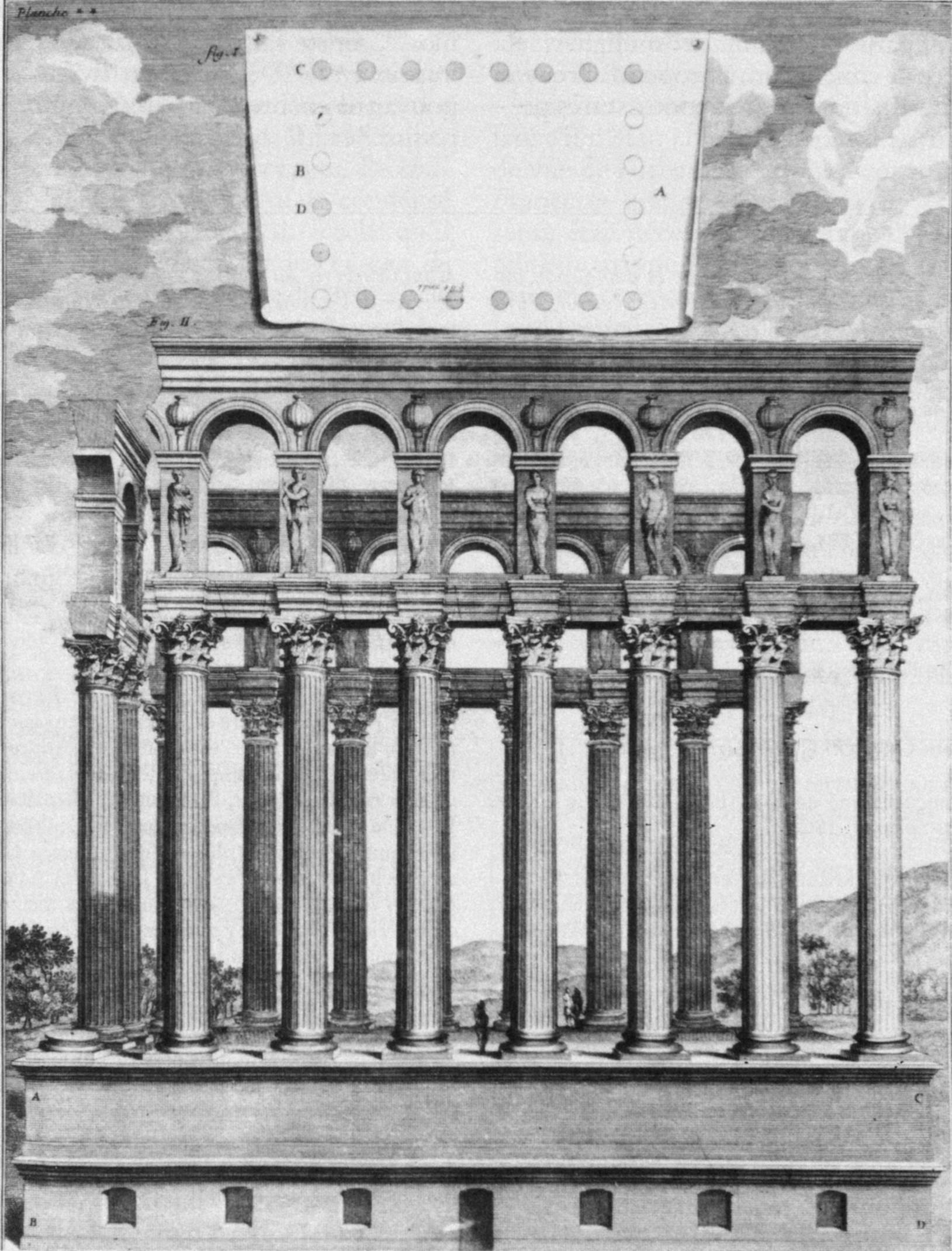
Gallo-Roman building named Piliers de Tutelle in Bordeaux (France). Destroyed in 1675. Drawing and map by Claude Perrault (1613-1688), engraved by Pierre Lepautre, 1669

Pierre Lepautre or Le Pautre (1652 – 16 November 1716) was a French drawing artist, engraver and architect, especially known as an ornemaniste, a prolific designer of ornament that presages the coming Rococo style. He was the son of the designer and engraver Jean Lepautre and nephew of the architect Antoine Lepautre. His appointment in 1699 as Dessinateur in the Bâtiments du Roi, the official design department of the French monarchy, headed by Jules Hardouin-Mansart and later Robert de Cotte in the declining years of Louis XIV, was signalled by the historian of the Rococo, Fiske Kimball, as a starting point in the genesis of the new style.

== Bibliography ==
- Dee, Elaine Evans (1982). "Lepautre, Pierre", vol. 2, pp. 687–688, in Macmillan Encyclopedia of Architects, edited by Adolf K. Placzek. London: Collier Macmillan. ISBN 9780029250006.
- Dee, Elaine Evans; Berger, Robert W.; Moureyre, Françoise de la (1996). "Le Pautre [Le Paultre; Lepautre]", vol. 19, pp. 210–213, in The Dictionary of Art, edited by Jane Turner. London: Macmillan. ISBN 9781884446009. Also at Oxford Art Online (subscription required).
- Kalnein, Wend von (1995). Architecture in France in the Eighteenth Century, translated by David Britt. New Haven: Yale University Press. ISBN 9780300060133.
- Kimball, Fiske (1943). The Creation of the Rococo. Philadelphia: Philadelphia Museum of Art. OCLC 2892380, 503738041. ISBN 9780486239897 (1980 Dover reprint as The Creation of the Rococo Decorative Style).
- Préaud, Maxime (2008). Inventaire du fonds français. Graveurs du XVIIe siècle. Tome 13. Pierre Lepautre. Paris: Bibliothèque nationale de France. ISBN 9782717723953.
- Souchal, François (1981). French Sculptors of the 17th and 18th centuries. Volume 2: The reign of Louis XIV. Illustrated Catalogue G–L. Oxford: Cassirer. ISBN 9780851810430.
