= Catherine Bellier =

Mistress of Louis XIV (1614–1689)

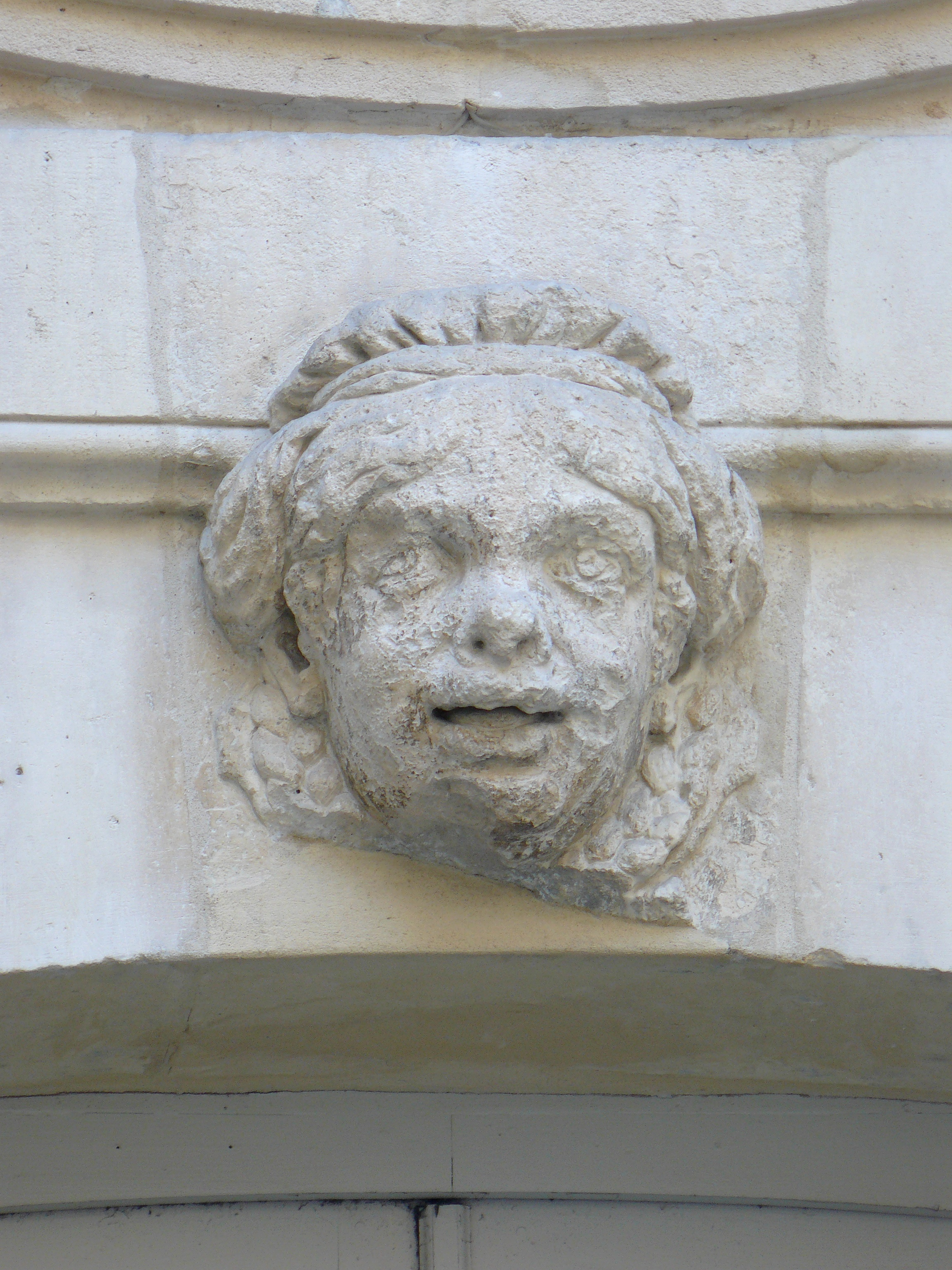
A grotesque face in the main courtyard of the Hotel de Beauvais, reputedly a portrait of Catherine Bellier

Catherine-Henriette Bellier, baroness de Beauvais (French pronunciation: [katʁin ɑ̃ʁjɛt bɛlje]; Poitou, 1614 – 7 June 1689 in Arrou), was a French courtier, best remembered as the first mistress of King Louis XIV.

== Biography ==
She was the daughter of Martin Bellier, a porter, and married Baron Pierre de Beauvais. She became première femme de Chambre to the French Queen, Anne of Austria, mother of King Louis XIV. During her time as première femme de Chambre, she had the intimate duty of giving the Queen her enema.

She is described as intelligent, plotting and a trusted companion of the dowager queen regent. Despite being described as ugly, she had several love affairs, such as with Henri-Louis de Gondrin, Archbishop of Sens.

In 1652, Queen Anne was worried about the possibility of her teenaged son, Louis XIV, being plagued by the same type of "sexual dysfunction" that his father seemed to have suffered from. She encouraged Bellier to deflower the 15 year old king in order to ensure that he was capable of producing heirs. Their relationship lasted for two years, after which the queen dowager awarded Bellier an estate and a pension.

As it was French custom to imitate the king, Catherine Bellier's sexual favors suddenly became high-demand. As Bellier aged though, she became overweight, her looks faded, and she fell into debt. By the time her husband died in 1674, she was destitute and was forced to live as a renter in the Hôtel de Beauvais.

In the 1670s, however, her finances was finally secured by help from her former lover Louis XIV. In the estimates for 1677, Madame de Beauvais is listed to receive a pension of 4000 livres, a pension that was raised to 8000 livres in the year 1684, and 30,000 livres in 1685.

During this time period, Saint-Simon noted that "Madame de Beauvais" often visited the royal court where she was always kindly received by the king, and that it was commonly known that it was she who had once taken the kings virginity, and he noted:

“I remember her when she was old, blind of one eye and scarce able to see with the other, at the toilette of the Bavarian Dauphiness, where all the Court treated her with extraordinary consideration, because from time to time she went to Versailles, and when there was invariably granted a private audience by the King, who still cherished a great regard for her.”

== Legacy ==
King Louis XIV funded the Hôtel de Beauvais in the Marais in Paris as a reward to Bellier.

She is portrayed by Valérie Thoumire in the French-produced television series drama Versailles.

== Sources ==
- Oliver Mallick: « Le principal passage pour aller à la ville de Dom Anna » : Mme de Beauvais et la charge de première femme de chambre de la reine (1646-1666), in: Femmes à la cour de France. Charges et fonctions (XV^{e}-XIX^{e} siècle), ed. by Caroline zum Kolk, Kathleen Wilson-Chevalier, Villeneuve d’Ascq: Septentrion, 2018, p. 107-125.
- L'Hôtel de Beauvais, hrsgg. von der Association pour la Sauvegarde et la Mise en valeur du Paris historique, Paris o.J.
