= Jean Le Pautre =

French designer and engraver (1618–1682)

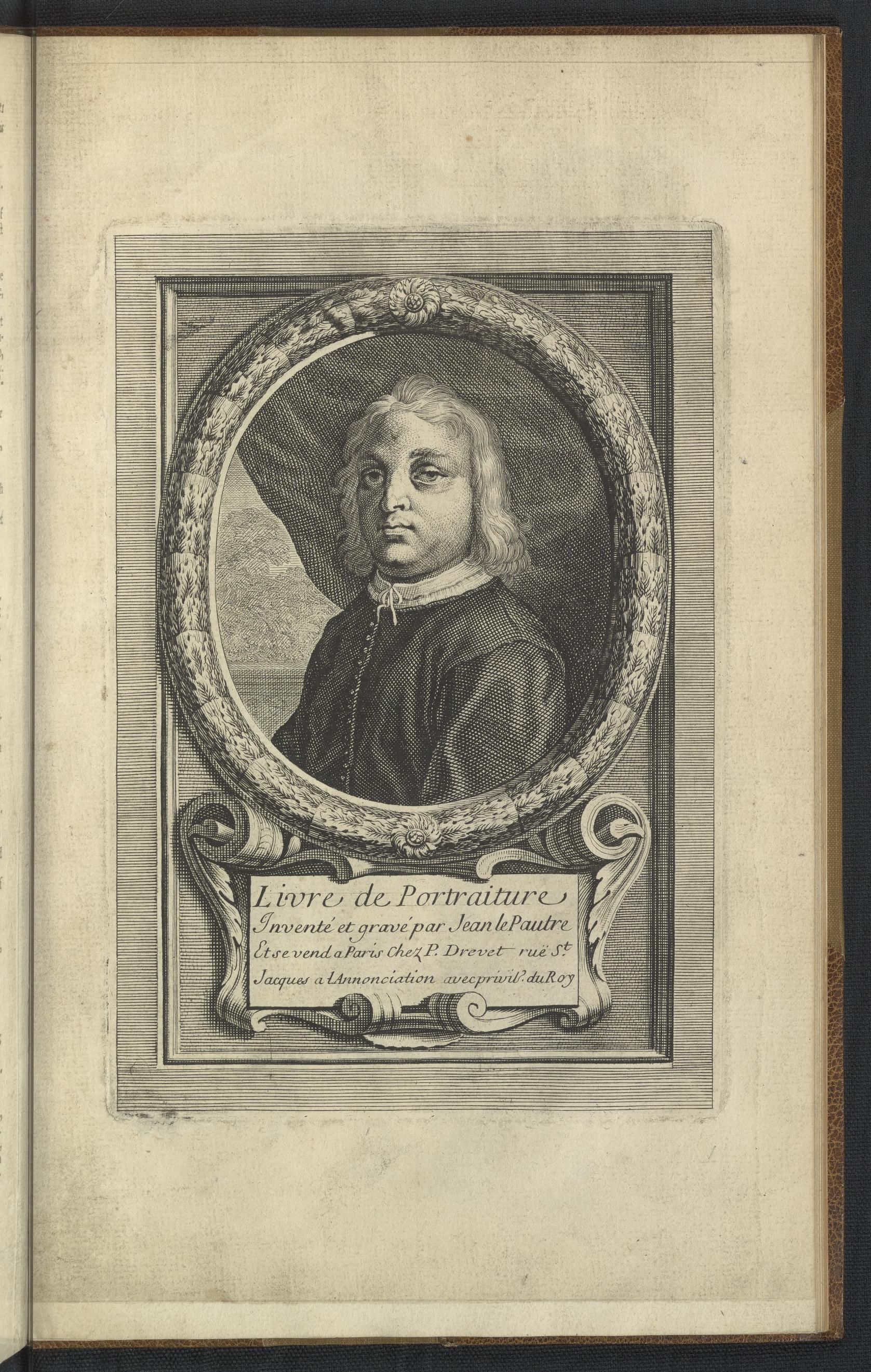
Portrait of Jean Le Pautre included in Livre de portraiture, inventé et gravé. From the Rosenwald Collection, Library of Congress.

Jean Le Pautre or Lepautre (baptised 28 June 1618; died 2 February 1682) was a French designer and engraver, the elder brother of the architect Antoine Le Pautre, the father of the engravers Pierre Le Pautre and Jacques Le Pautre, and the uncle of the sculptor Pierre Lepautre. Jean Le Pautre was an apprentice to a carpenter and builder. In addition to learning mechanical and constructive work, he developed considerable skill with the pencil.

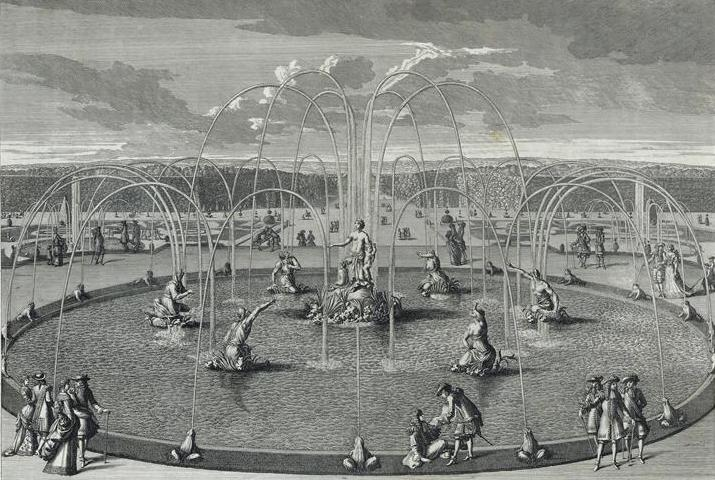
Jean Le Pautre, Sight of the Basin of Latone in the Gardens of Versailles, 1678

His designs, innumerable in quantity and exuberant in content, consisted mainly of ceilings, friezes, chimney-pieces, doorways and mural decorations. He also devised fire-dogs, sideboards, cabinets, console tables, mirrors and other pieces of furniture.

Le Pautre was long employed at the Gobelins manufactory. His work is often very flamboyant and elaborate. He frequently used amorini and swags, arabesques and cartouches in his work. His chimney-pieces, in contrast, were often simple and elegant. His engraved plates, nearly 1,500 in number, are almost entirely original and include a portrait of himself. He made many designs for Andre Charles Boulle.

In 1677 he became a member of the French Academy as a dessignateur and graveur.

Le Pautre's daughter Marie in 1669 became the second wife of the sculptor Pierre Le Gros the Elder and stepmother to the three-year-old Pierre Le Gros the Younger, who in turn learned drawing from Jean Le Pautre.
