= Hôtel de Beauvais =

Coordinates: 48°51′18.70″N 2°21′30.00″E

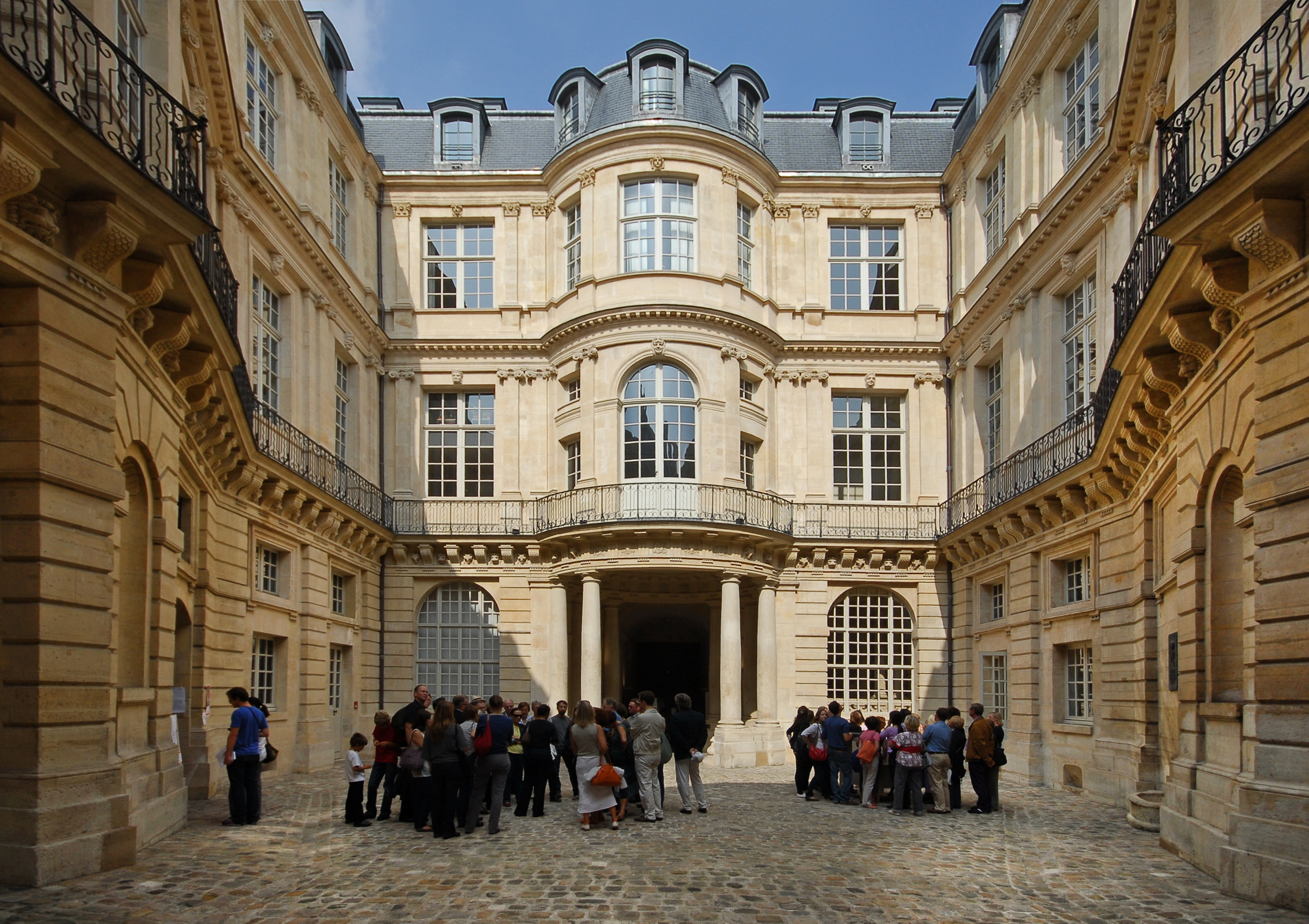
- Interactive map of the Hôtel de Beauvais area

General information
- Type: Hôtel particulier
- Location: 68, rue François-Miron, Paris, France
- Current tenants: Administrative Court of Appeal of Paris
- Construction started: 1657
- Completed: 1660
- Owner: French State

Design and construction
- Architect: Antoine Le Pautre

The Hôtel de Beauvais (French pronunciation: [otɛl d(ə) bovɛ]) is an hôtel particulier, a kind of large townhouse in France, at 68 rue François-Miron, 4th arrondissement, Paris, currently the seat of the Administrative Court of Appeal of Paris. Until 1865 rue François-Miron formed part of the historic rue Saint-Antoine and as such was part of the ceremonial route into Paris from the east. The hôtel was built by the royal architect Antoine Le Pautre for Catherine Beauvais starting in 1657. It is an example of eclectic French Baroque architecture. Since 1966 it has been a monument historique.

== History ==
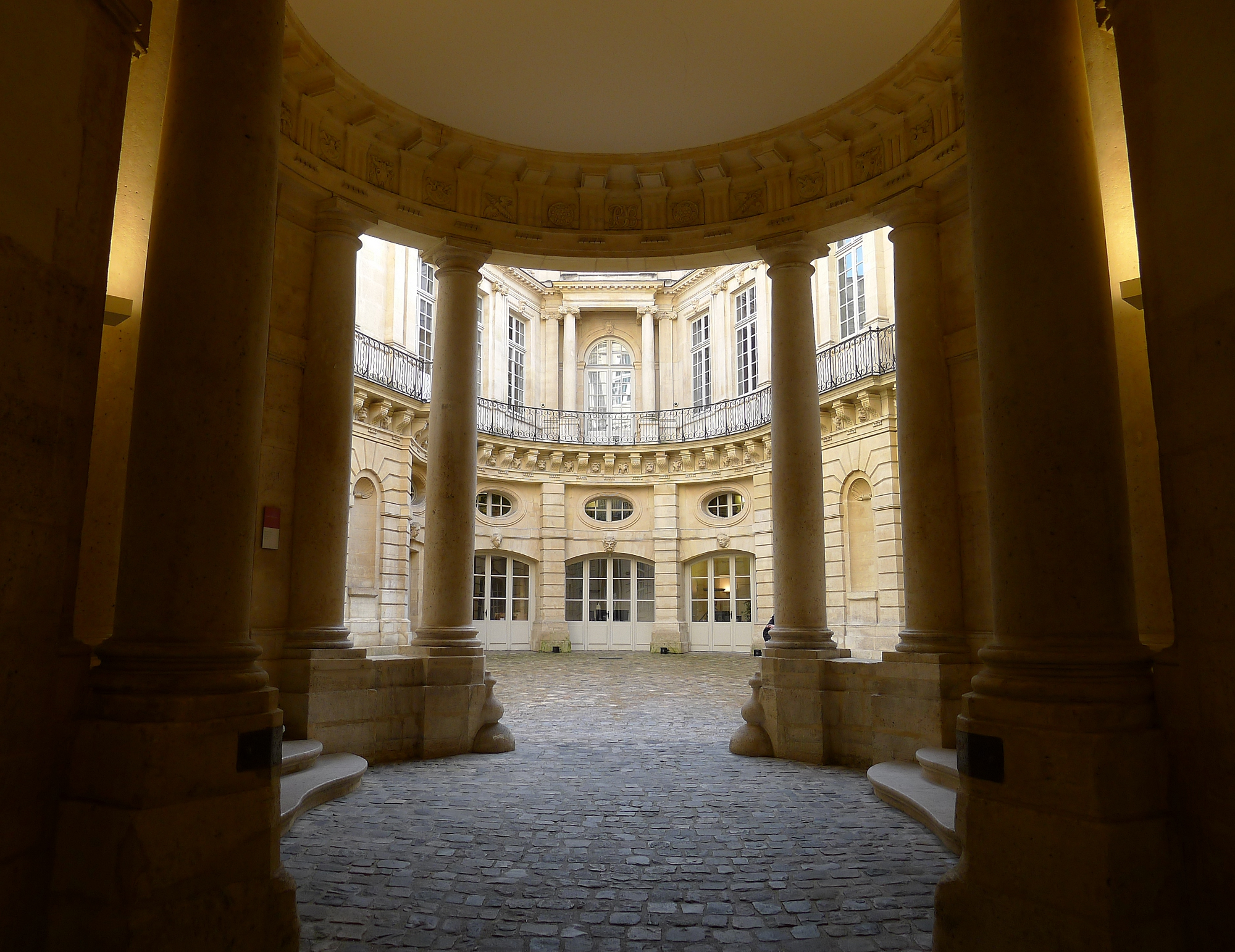
View from the rotunda vestibule into the courtyard

Catherine Beauvais was the first lady to Anne of Austria, and was rumored to have provided Louis XIV with his first heterosexual experience. Favoured by the Queen regent, Catherine Beauvais was given gifts of money and later expensive building materials that had been destined to be used in the extension of the Cour Carrée of the Louvre Palace. The Hôtel Beauvais was built partly over land that had belonged to Cistercian monks during the 13th century. All that is left of their town house is the vaulted cellar that has been preserved in the basement of the 17th-century building.

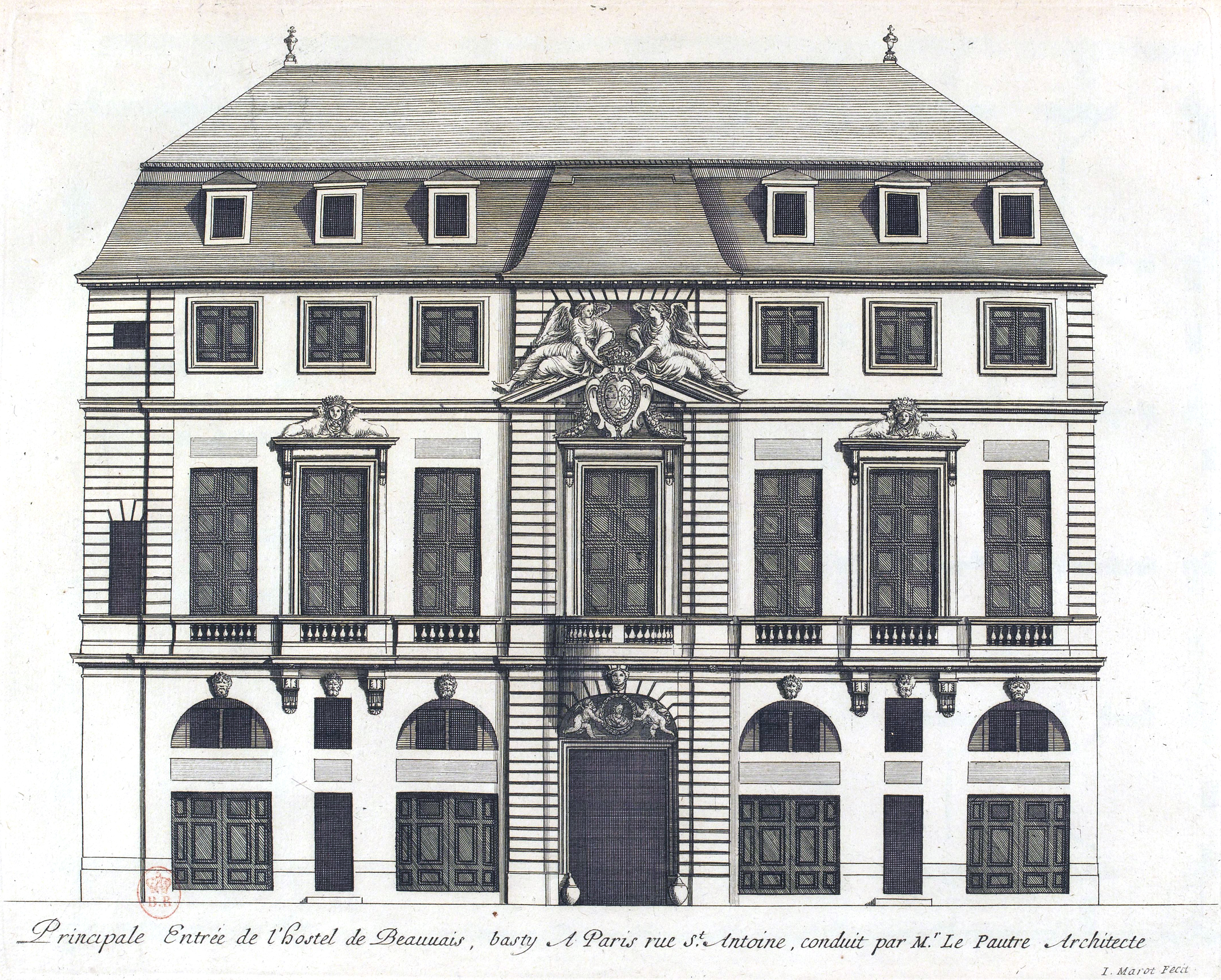
Engraving of the hôtel de Beauvais from Jean Marot's L'Architecture française

On August 26, 1660, King Louis the XIV and his new wife Maria-Theresa made a triumphal entry into Paris, stopping at the Hotel de Beauvais to salute Beauvais, who stood on the protruding balcony that overlooked the street. In 1763 the hotel came into possession of the Bavarian ambassador, who received a visit that year from Mr. Leopold Mozart, his wife, and children, including Wolfgang, age seven. During the French Revolution the building was requisitioned by the state and sold to a private individual. In 1800 the building was divided up into 40 apartments. The building was significantly changed and some parts became damaged or demolished. An extra floor is also added between the first and second floors in order to create extra rental space. In 1918, the building was damaged during shelling. Until 1987 the Hôtel was home to a variety of tenants including a school and, between 1941 and 1972, a private maternity clinic. During the Nazi occupation Jewish residents were moved out.

In 1926 the Hôtel de Beauvais was partly listed as a historical monument because of its main entrance, the grand staircase and the façade overlooking the central courtyard. The entirety of the building wasn't listed until 1966. In the early 20th century, the building was in danger of demolition as part of an effort to redevelop poor and insalubrious areas of the city. The Marais and the areas around what is now the Pompidou Centre are particularly targeted. However, due to the efforts of the Minister of Culture André Malraux and heritage activists, much of the Marais was slowly restored during the late 20th century rather than demolished. Between 1967 and 1970 the medieval cellar was cleared and restored by the association Paris Historique. The restoration of the building was completed in 2003, and today contains the Administrative Court of Appeal of Paris (Cour administrative d'appel de Paris) and is mostly inaccessible to the public except for the court public audiences. However, the historic parts of the building can be visited during European Heritage Days. The building can also be visited once a month under the auspices of Paris Historique. The courtyard has been used as a theatre, notably during the Festival du Marais.

== Architecture ==
Hôtel de Beauvais’ façade is in the French Baroque style, common to hôtels particuliers. Strict symmetry is created using false walls and windows. The façade uses vertical bands of rusticated stone and horizontal moldings instead of orders to define major lines.

=== Novel elements and precedents ===
The building contains several unexpected elements for an hôtel particulier. Public shops were located along the ground level, which may have been a continuation of an ancient Roman tradition. The mezzanine windows, which were uncommon in Paris, may have been a throwback to High Renaissance in Rome. In the plan, there are different paths for circulation for servants and noblemen. Many unusual details of the plan: the corps de logis placed along the street with the cour d’honneur behind, the circular vestibule, the angled passage from the court to the rue de Jouy, the semicircular ending of the court, and the stair at the left rear of the court, were the result of Le Pautre's use of the foundations of the three medieval houses that originally occupied the lot.

=== Critical reception ===
Le Pautre's major triumph was in his treatment of the irregular site and the creation of a symmetrical façade. Architectural historians also laud the building for its influence on the free plan; seen in the central cour d’honneur, created by the articulation of pochè and an ambivalence towards solid space.

Plans

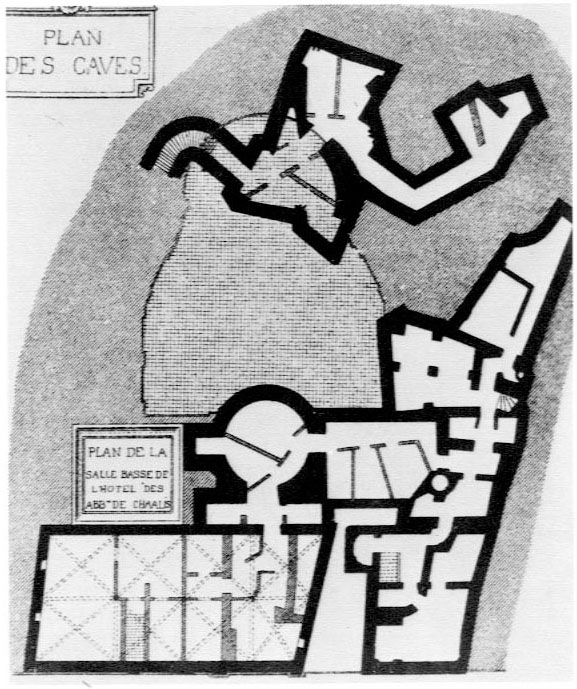
Foundations of the original medieval building with the outline of the completed cour d’honneur.

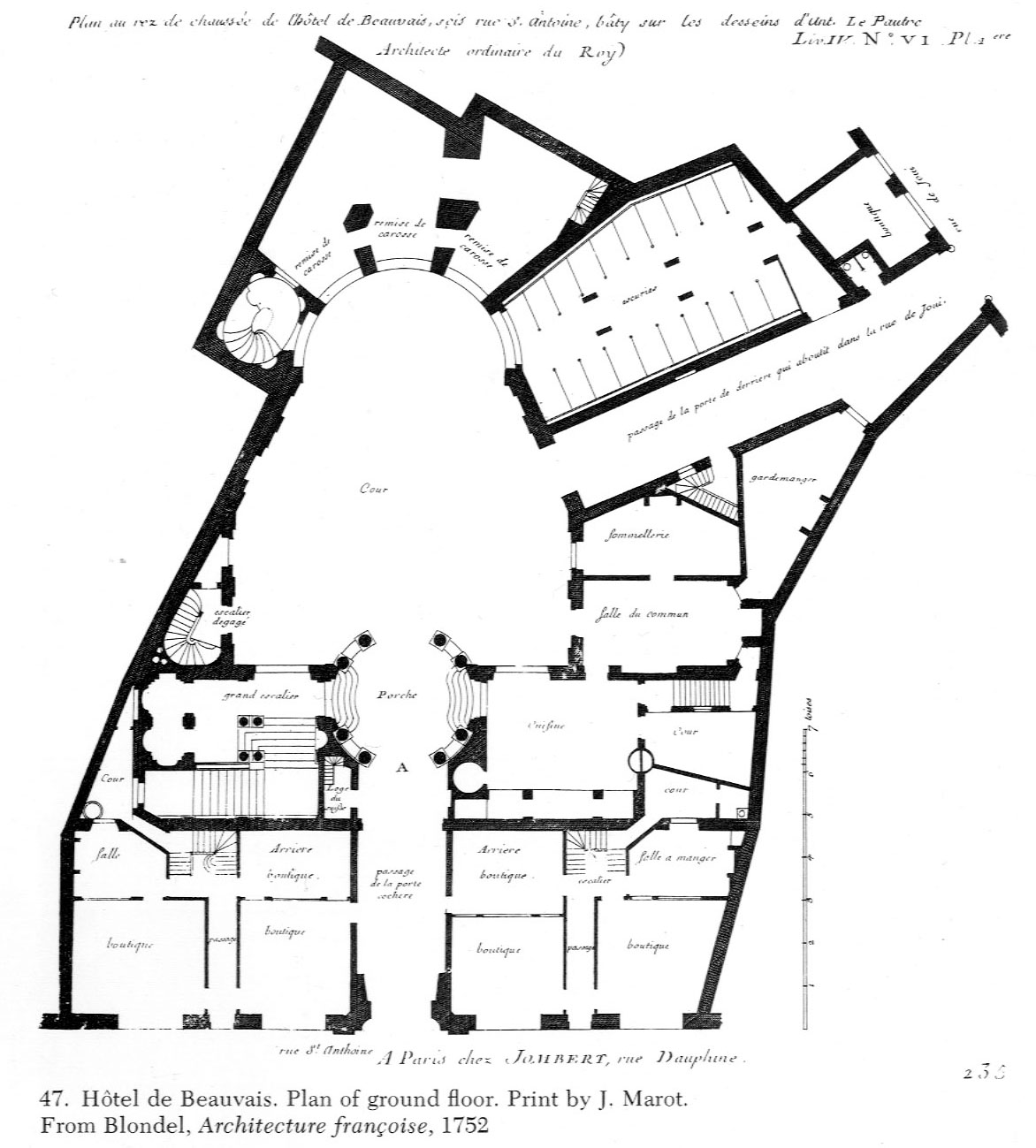
Ground Floor

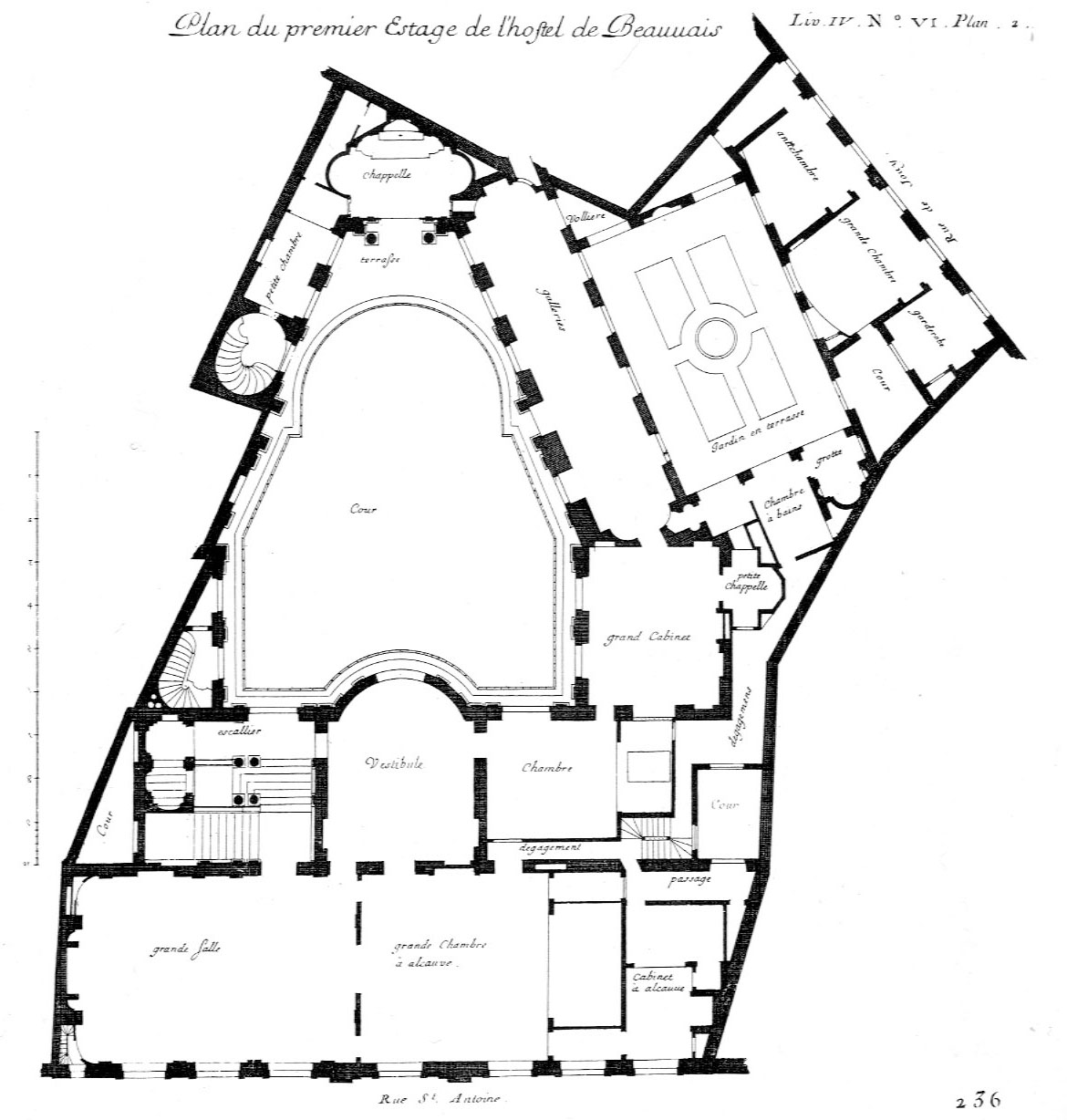
First Floor
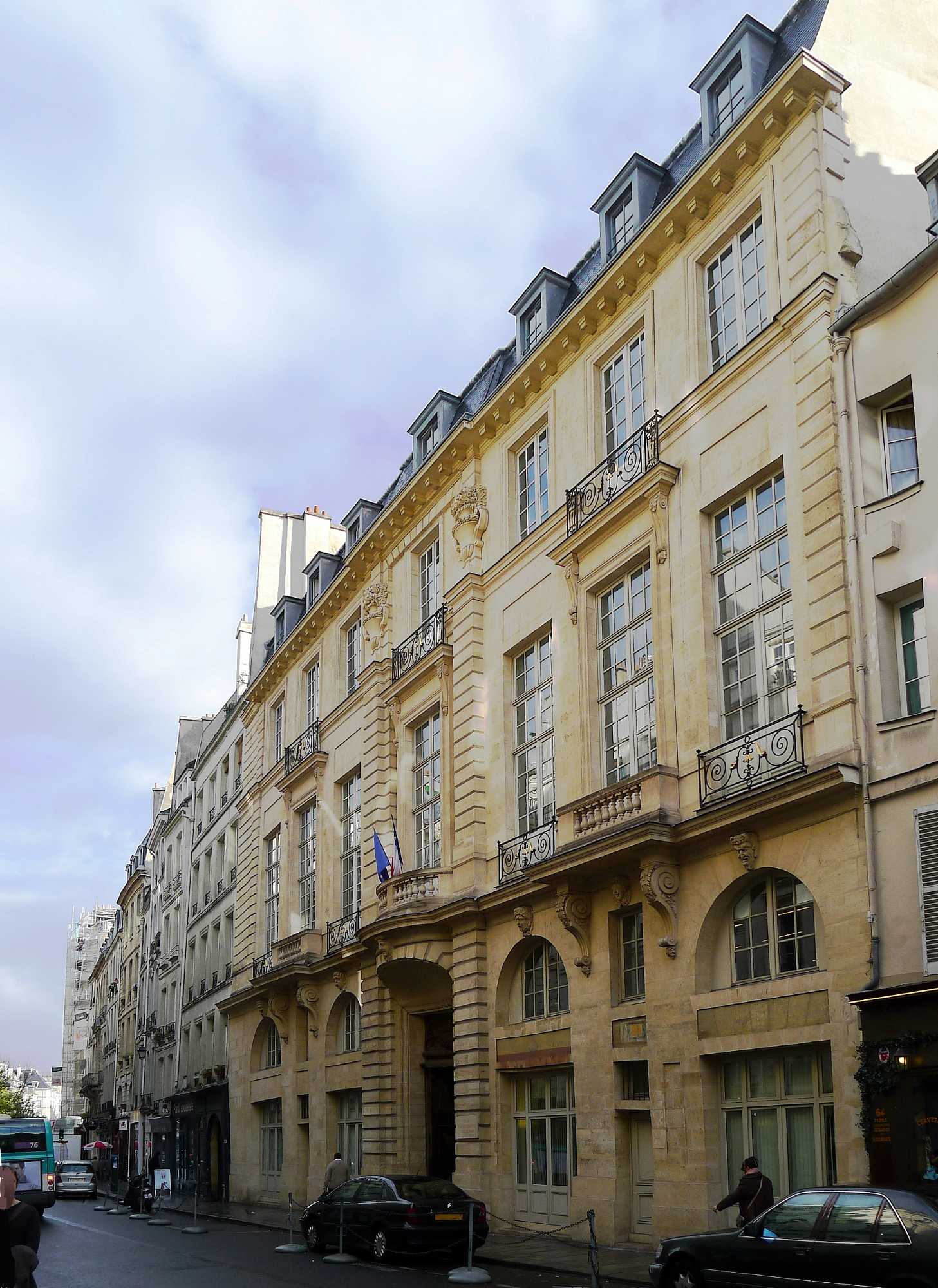
The street facade on the rue Saint-Antoine

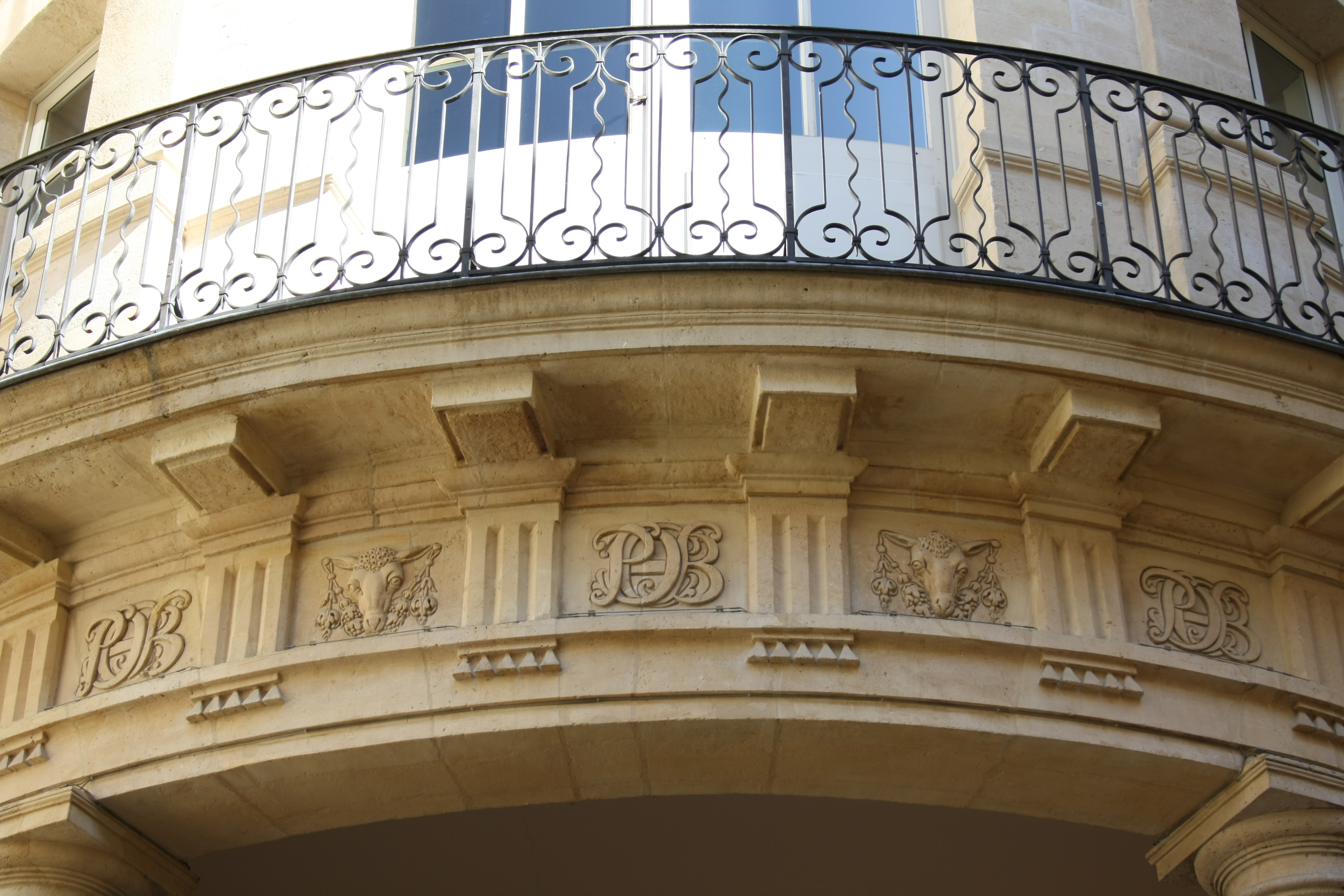
The courtyard balcony with the monogram PCHB, standing for Pierre, Catherine-Henriette, Beauvais

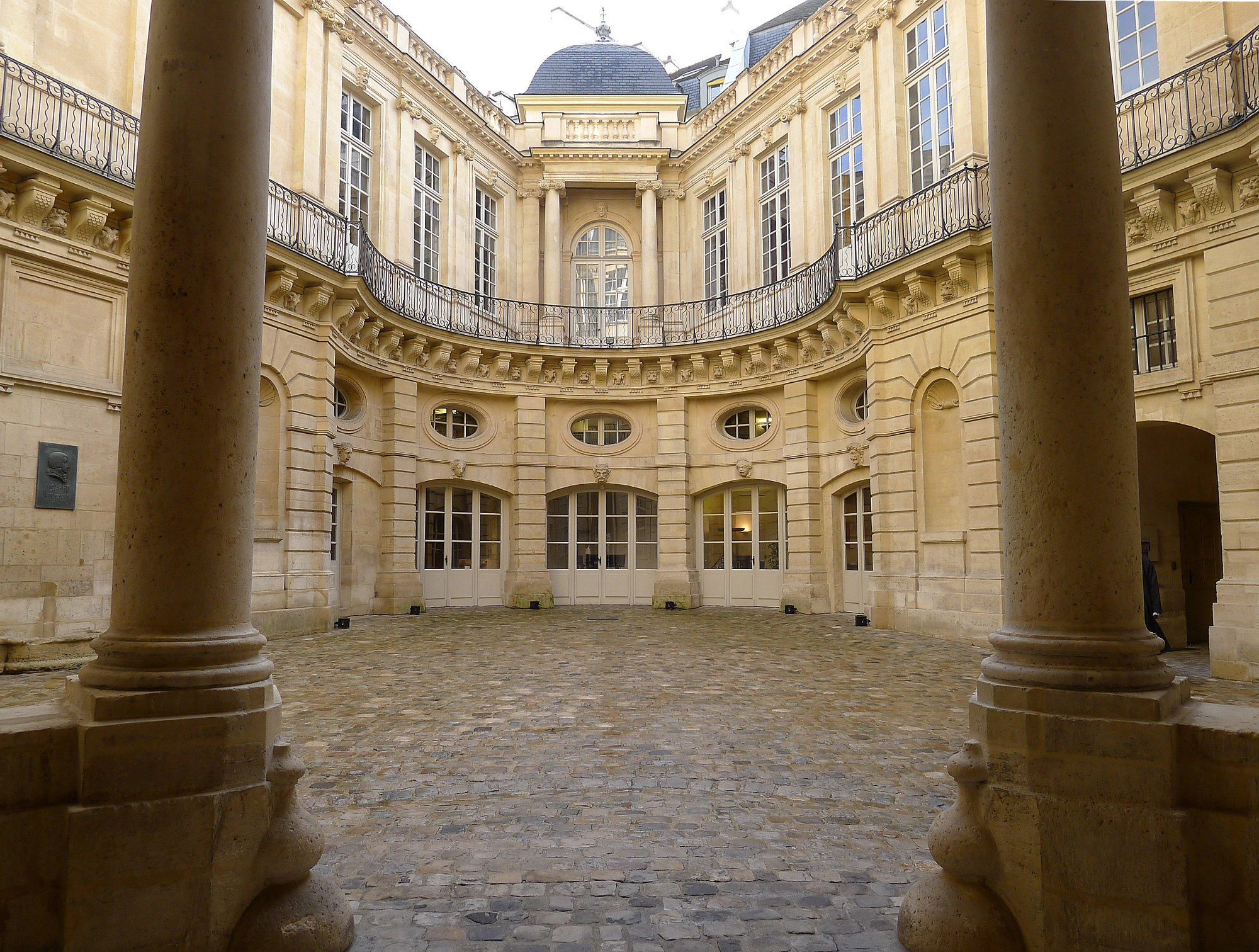
The oval courtyard

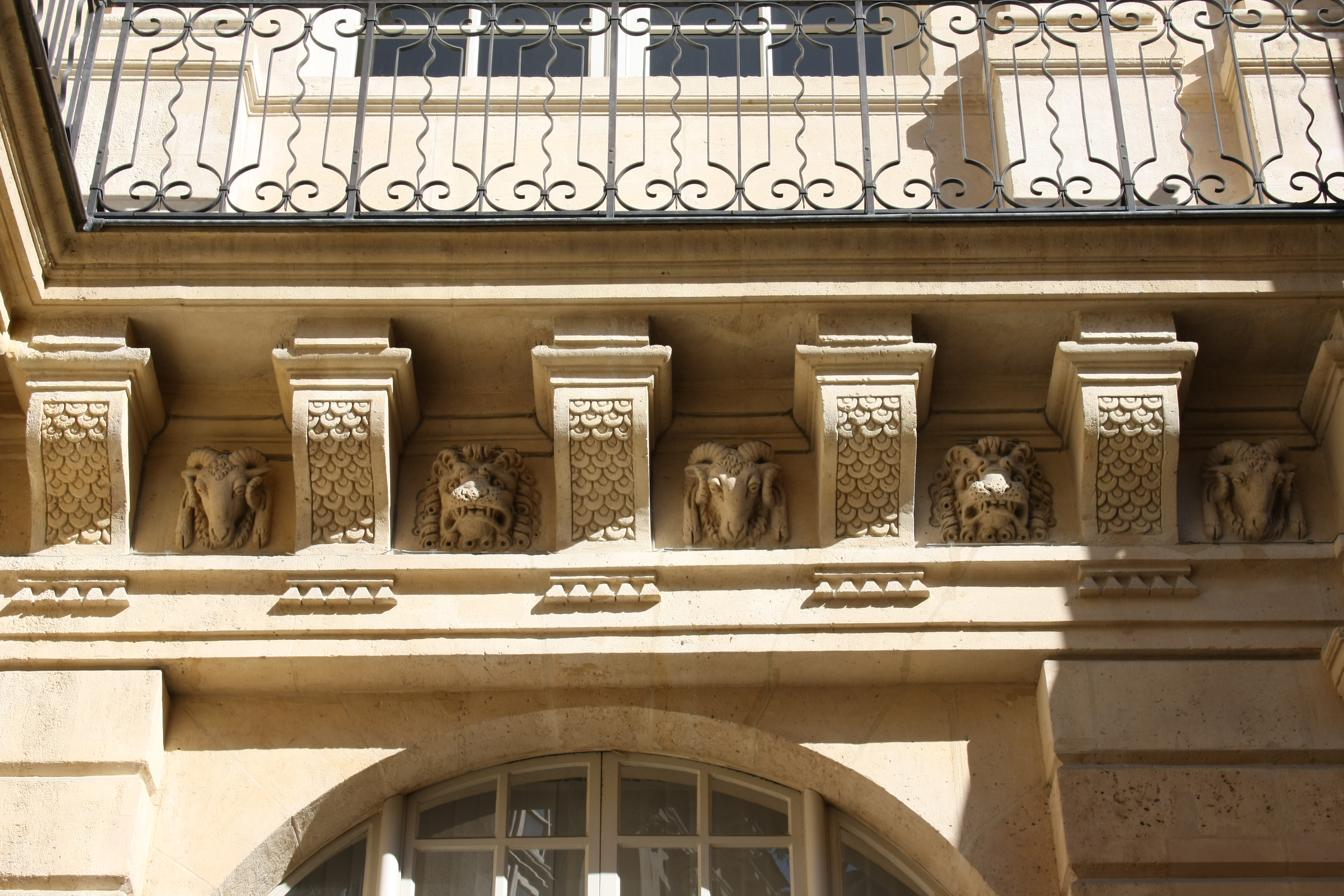
Mascarons on the courtyard balcony frise

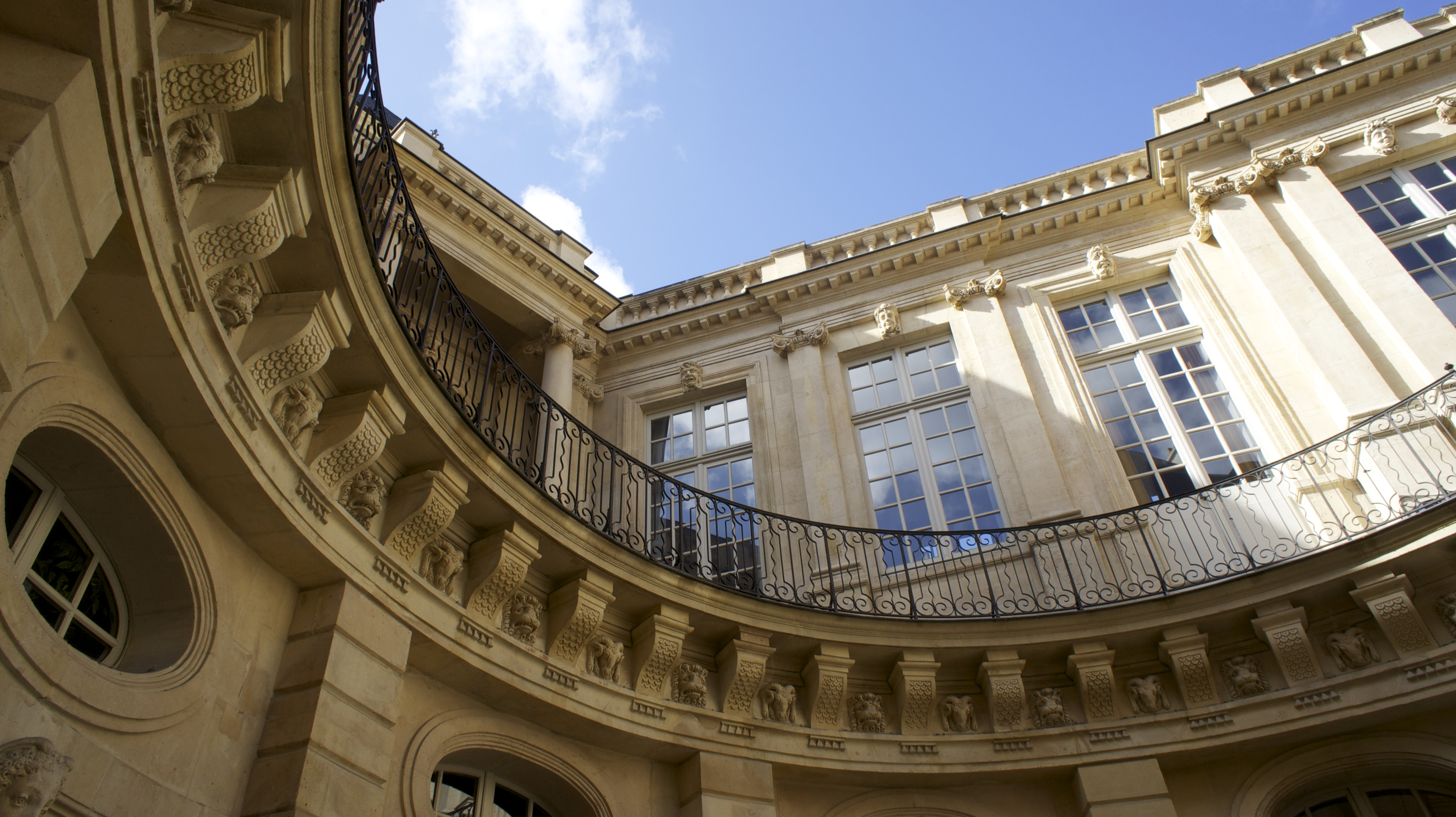
Detail of the courtyard

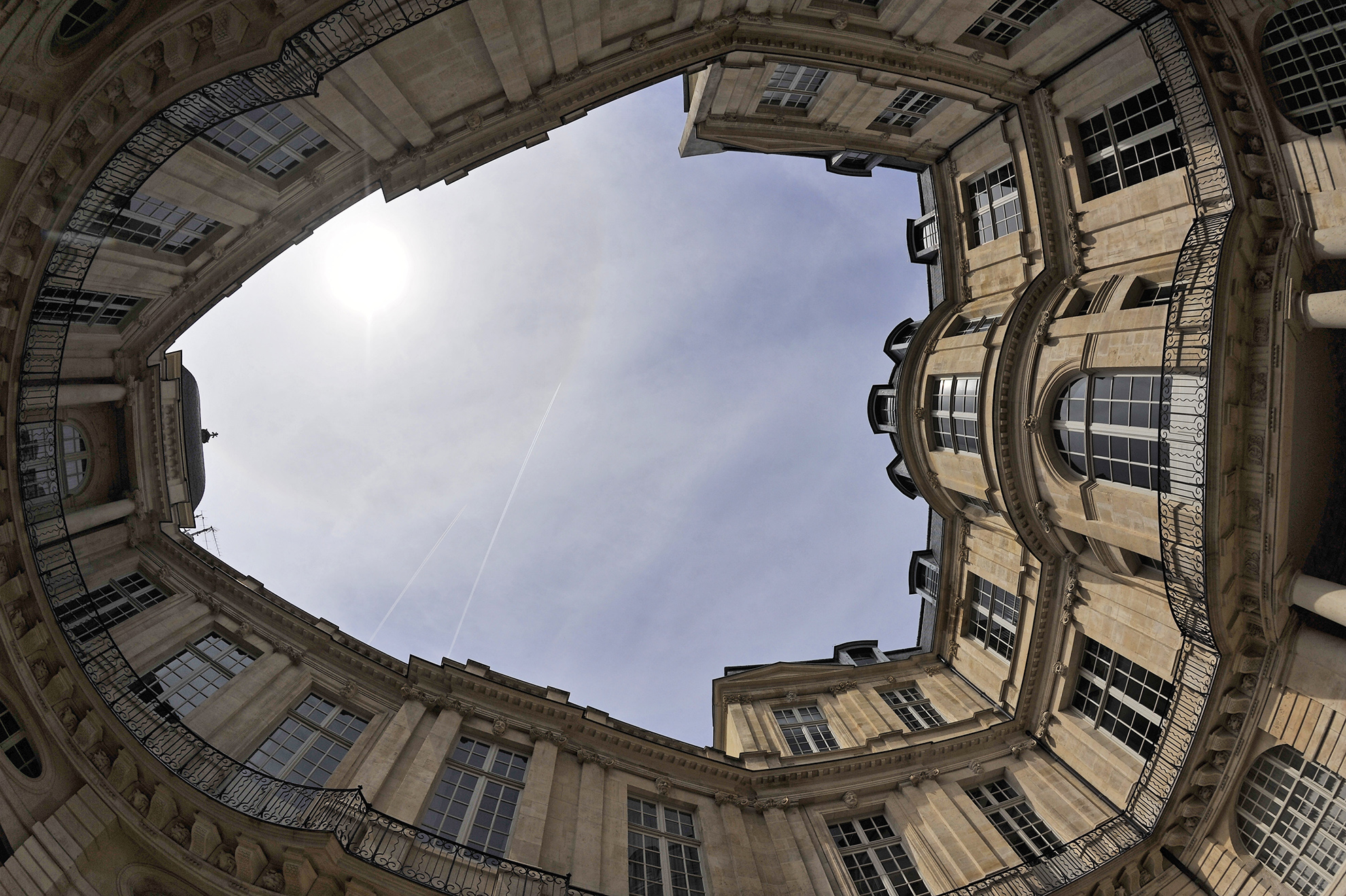
General view of the courtyard, showing its unusual oval shape
