= Robert de Cotte =

French architect (1656–1735)

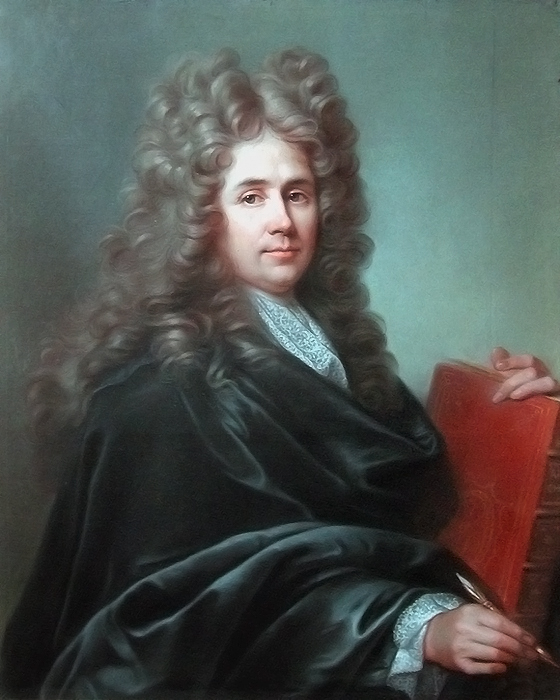
Robert de Cotte, 1701, pastel on paper by Joseph Vivien

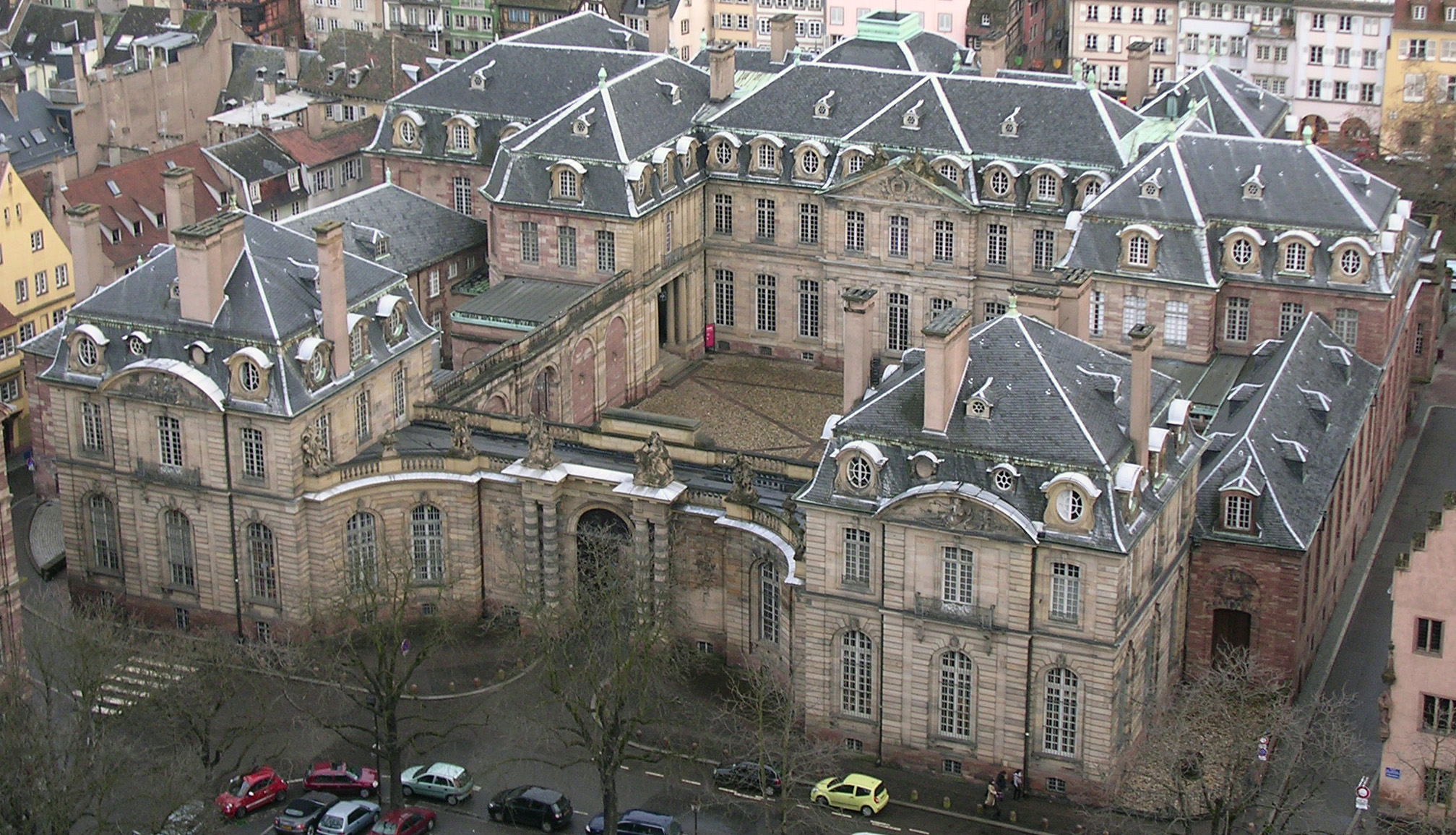
Palais Rohan, Strasbourg, for Armand Gaston Maximilien, prince de Rohan, bishop of Strasbourg (planned 1727–8, built 1731–42)

Robert de Cotte (French pronunciation: [ʁɔbɛʁ də kɔt]; 1656 – 15 July 1735) was a French architect-administrator, under whose design control of the royal buildings of France from 1699, the earliest notes presaging the Rococo style were introduced. First a pupil of Jules Hardouin-Mansart, he later became his brother-in-law and his collaborator. After Hardouin-Mansart's death, de Cotte completed his unfinished projects, notably the royal chapel at Versailles and the Grand Trianon.

== Biography ==
Born in Paris around 1656, Robert de Cotte began his career as a contractor for masonry, working on important royal projects between 1682 and 1685, when he was made a member of the Académie royale d'architecture and architect of the Court, ranking third in importance after Mansart's seldom-credited assistant François Dorbay. On his return to France after a six-month sojourn in Italy (1689–1690), in the company of Jacques Gabriel, he became the director of the Manufacture des Gobelins, where not only the famous tapestries, but also royal furnishings were produced; even designs made under his direction for wrought iron balustrading are to be found among the eight volumes of drawings for the Gobelins, and for other public and private commissions, conserved at the Cabinet des Estampes, Bibliothèque Nationale. In 1699, when Mansart was made Surintendant des Bâtiments, a position otherwise invariably reserved for a noble layman, de Cotte became his second-in-command in an executive function, charged with overseeing all the files of drawings, the stocks of marble and other materials including those for the royal manufactures of the Gobelins and Savonnerie, with overseeing the bidding process with contractors and with liaison with the Académie, of which he was made a member that same year. Fiske Kimball, the chronicler of the Rococo, notes that there are no surviving drawings by de Cotte from this period, nor from the period after Mansart's death in May 1708.

From 1708, Robert de Cotte was Premier architecte du Roi and director of the Académie royale d'architecture. He was in charge of the Bâtiments du Roi, which had been organized by Hardouin-Mansart into the prototype of all modern architectural offices, where the roles of director, comptroller, inspector, architect and draftsman were specialized, and the personalities involved submerged under the aegis of the Premier Architecte. The last years of Louis XIV are not on the whole periods of intense activity at Versailles, where the single great enterprise, already in progress at de Cotte's accession, was the Chapel, completed in 1710; there the decorative designs were actually the work of Pierre Lepautre, whom Fiske Kimball characterized as the "father of the Rococo".

De Cotte, with ever-widening responsibilities at Court, was also occupied with projects in Paris. His name is inscribed on the first draft for the final project for Place Vendôme (1699). De Cotte was responsible for the Hôtel de Pontchartrain (Chancellerie, 1703); his team was busy building hôtels particuliers in Paris, notably the Hôtel de Lude (1710, demolished), the Hôtel d'Estrées in rue de Grenelle (1713, remodelled); surviving drawings for interiors are in the hand of Pierre Lepautre. De Cotte was in charge of the team that remodelled François Mansart's Hôtel de Vrillière in 1714-1715 for Louis XIV's legitimated son, the comte de Toulouse; the outstanding features were the grand staircase, in which several sculptors collaborated, and the Gallery (1718–1719), upon which de Cotte's reputation has rested, and which survives. Mariette attributed its design to François-Antoine Vassé, and Fiske Kimball, on the basis of surviving preparatory drawings, concurred.

Designs for the
Buen Retiro wing of the Electoral Palace
(Bonn, Germany)

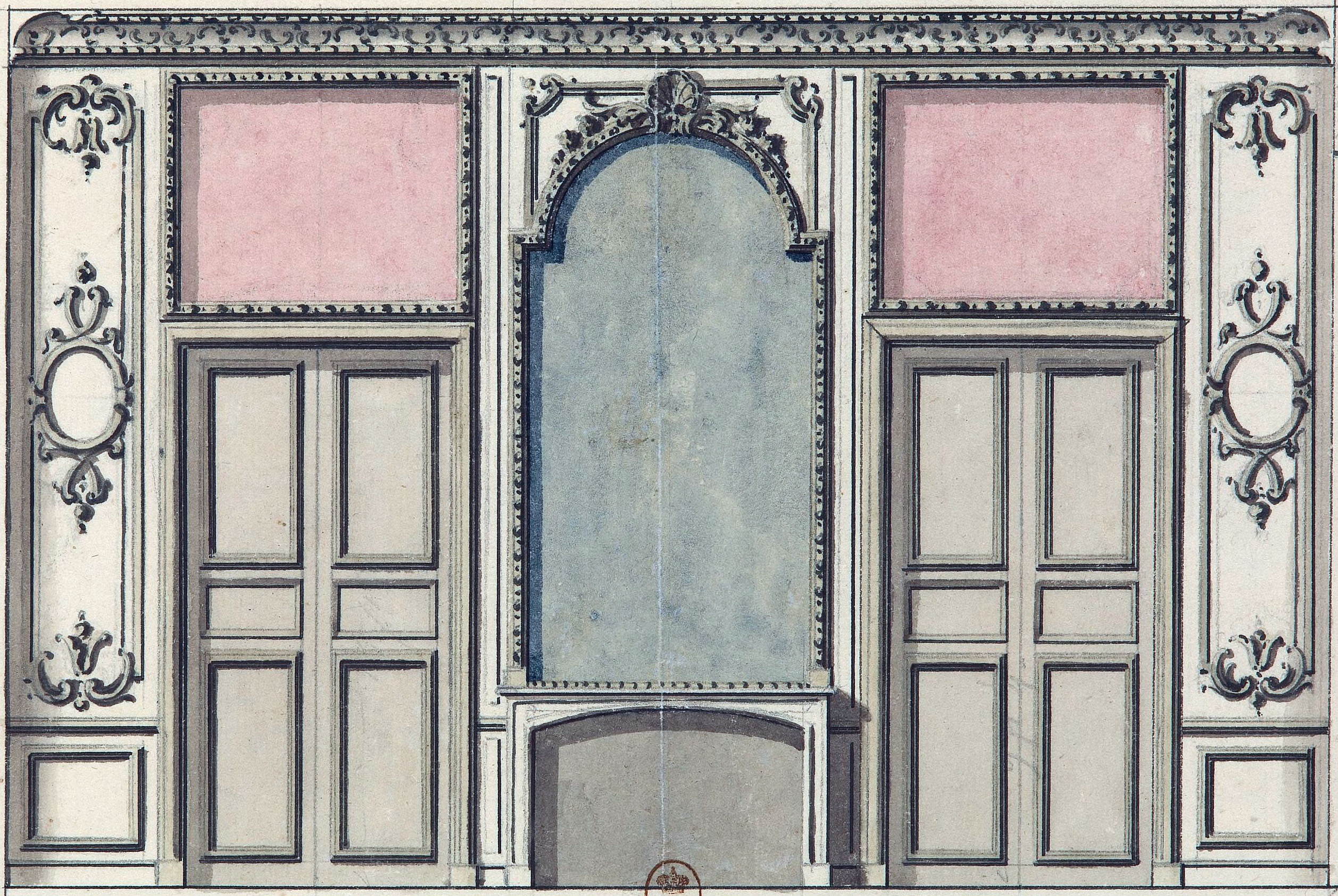
Antechamber

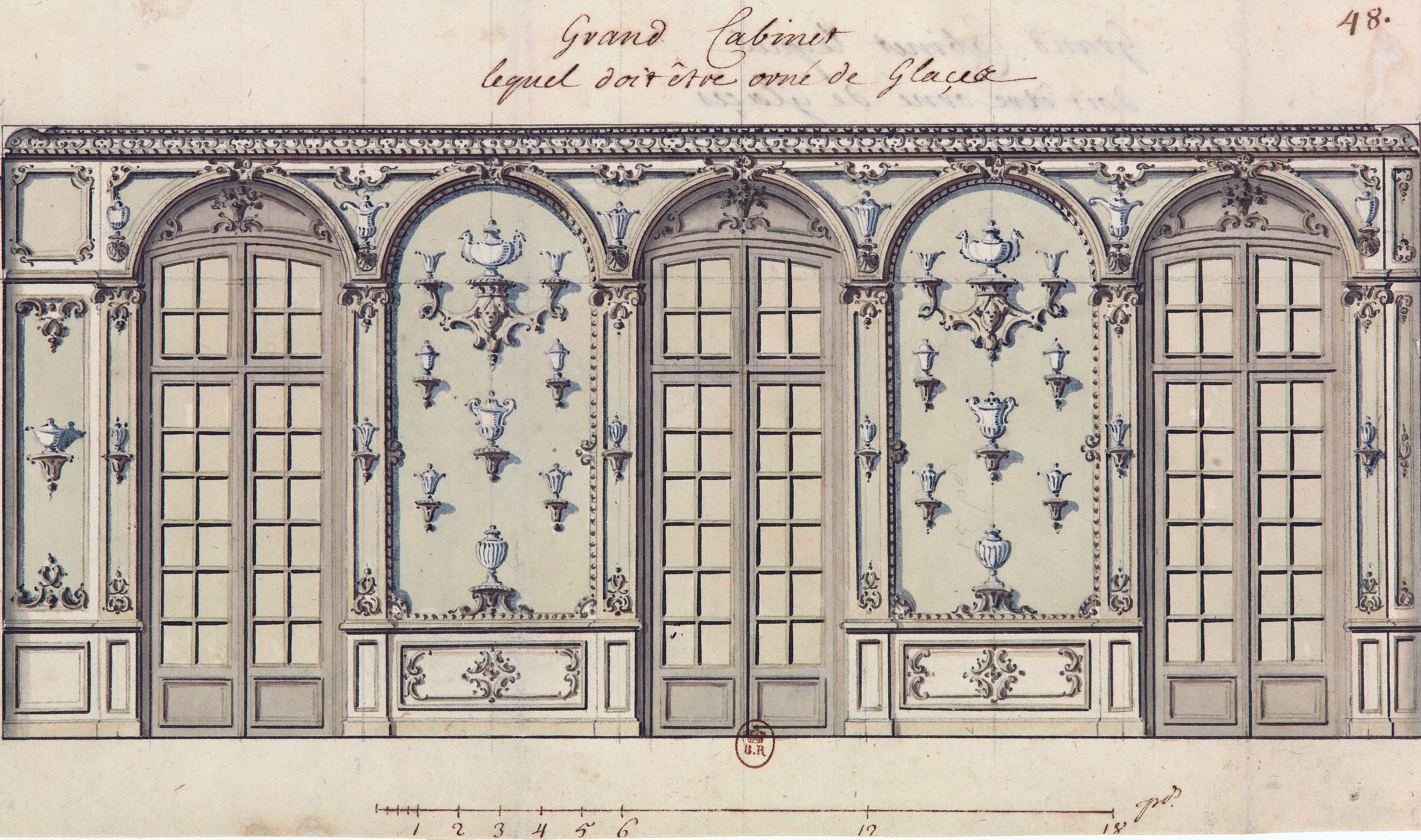
Grand Cabinet
(with decorated mirrors)

With the Régence during the minority of Louis XV, coinciding with de Cotte's maturity, the artistic lead in France passed smoothly in 1715 from the Bâtiments du Roi to the work being done by Gilles-Marie Oppenord for the Regent, Philippe, duc d'Orléans, at the Palais Royal in Paris. No new architects were added to the rolls of the Bâtiments du Roi. De Cotte, one of Europe's most prominently-placed architects, served by a rigorously-trained staff, was free to accept private commissions, assisted during his later years by his son Jules-Robert de Cotte (1683–1767). Balthasar Neumann, in Paris to consult him over the building operations at Würzburg, found him and his son grandly occupied.

At this period, de Cotte was responsible for the Hôtel de Conti, rue de Bourbon (1716–19, acquired by the duc du Maine; demolished) and the Hôtel de Bourvallais, Place Vendôme, now the Ministry of Justice.

Outside France, de Cotte's team was commissioned for projects to be completed on site by local craftsmen. In Bonn, his team was extensively employed by the Elector of Cologne, for the design of his rural Poppelsdorf Palace (from 1715) and interior remodeling (1716–1717) of his urban Electoral Palace. The decoration of the Cabinet des Glâces in the latter palace followed designs by Oppenord that featured reverse curves and garlands applied to mirror surfaces, a new feature. A new wing called the Buen Retiro was commissioned in the autumn of 1717.

From newly-Bourbon Spain, the princesse des Ursins required his advice on the remodeling of her Château de Chanteloup near Amboise (Neuman, p. 229, note 4) and the queen's apartments of the royal palace in Madrid. An octagonal room was fabricated in Paris under de Cotte's eye, 1713–1715, and sent to be installed in Madrid. At La Granja, an assistant from de Cotte's office, René Carlier, was employed in the designs for the parterres. For the cardinal de Rohan, de Cotte provided decors for the Château de Saverne in Alsace (1721–1722; destroyed by fire).

With the death of Lepautre in 1716, de Cotte turned for the invention of ornaments to the sculptor François-Antoine Vassé, "responsible for all that is of creative significance in De Cotte's later works, as Lepautre had been in the previous period". He died in Passy (now part of Paris).

He died on 15 July 1735 in Paris.
