= Antoine Lepautre =

French architect and engraver

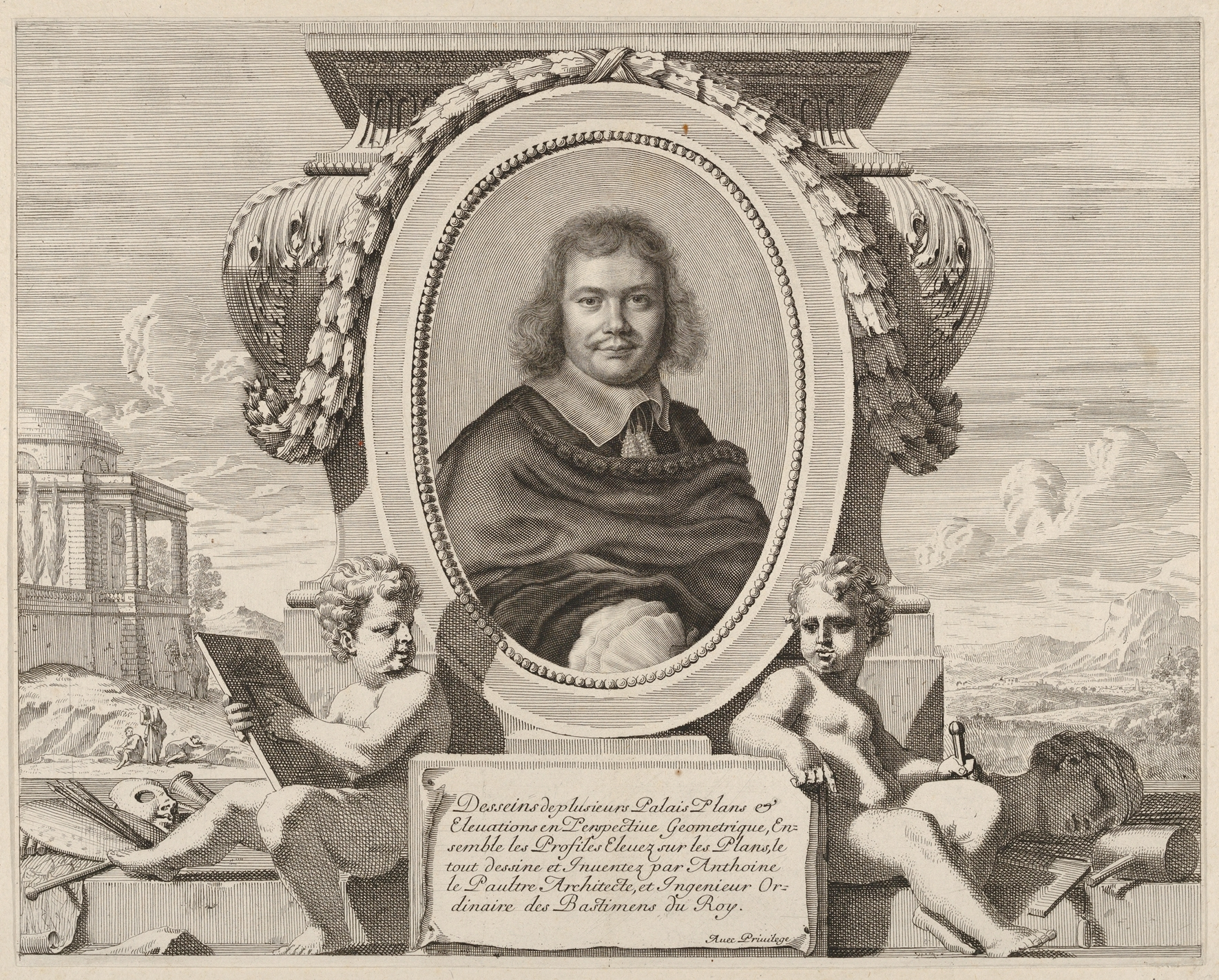
Antoine Lepautre c. 1653, portrait engraved by Robert Nanteuil within an engraving by Jean Lepautre from Antoine's Oeuvres d'architecture

Antoine Lepautre (French pronunciation: [ɑ̃twan ləpotʁ]) or Le Pautre (1621–1679) was a French architect and engraver. Born in Paris, he was the brother of the prolific and inventive designer-engraver Jean Lepautre. Antoine Lepautre has been called "one of the most inventive architects of the early years of Louis XIV's reign". He was a protégé of Cardinal Mazarin, to whom he dedicated his Desseins de plusieurs palais (Paris, 1652/3), in which his imagination is given free rein.

In 1646–1648, Lepautre built a chapel for the Jansenist Convent of Port-Royal at Paris.

His Hôtel de Beauvais (1655–1660), rue François-Miron, built for Pierre de Beauvais and his wife Catherine Henriette Bellier, première dame de chambre to Anne of Austria, brought Lepautre celebrity for the ingenious way he made use of a highly irregular parcel of land, ranging his structure round an oval court. The Hôtel de Beauvais's architectural qualities were noted by Bernini during his Paris sojourn, and it remains Lepautre's outstanding surviving monument.

The design and construction of the Château du Vaudreuil (Eure) in 1658–1660 has been attributed to Lepautre, but Robert W. Berger, the author of a monograph on the architect, considers this attribution to be doubtful.

In 1660 Lepautre was appointed house architect to Philippe I, Duke of Orléans, the brother of Louis XIV. In this quality he built the wings for the lost Château de Saint-Cloud and constructed the celebrated Grand Cascade that survives in its park.

Drawings conserved in the Swedish National Museum of Fine Arts, Stockholm, demonstrate that Lepautre was the designer of stables for Jean-Baptiste Colbert at the Château de Sceaux, in the early 1670s.

Madame de Montespan commissioned him to make plans for her Château de Clagny, close to Versailles; the unfinished project was completed after Lepautre's death by Jules Hardouin-Mansart. For Antoine Nompar de Caumont, duc de Lauzun, Lepautre built the Hôtel de Lauzun at Saint-Germain-en-Laye.

In 1671, he became one of the first eight members of the Académie royale d'architecture created by Louis XIV.

The monograph in English is Robert W. Berger, Antoine Le Pautre: a French architect of the era of Louis XIV (New York University Press) 1969.
