= 1855 in architecture =

The year 1855 in architecture involved some significant architectural events and new buildings.

== Events ==
- October 15 – The second of the Prussia Columns is inaugurated, on the 60th birthday of their instigator, King Frederick William IV of Prussia.

== Buildings and structures ==
=== Buildings completed ===
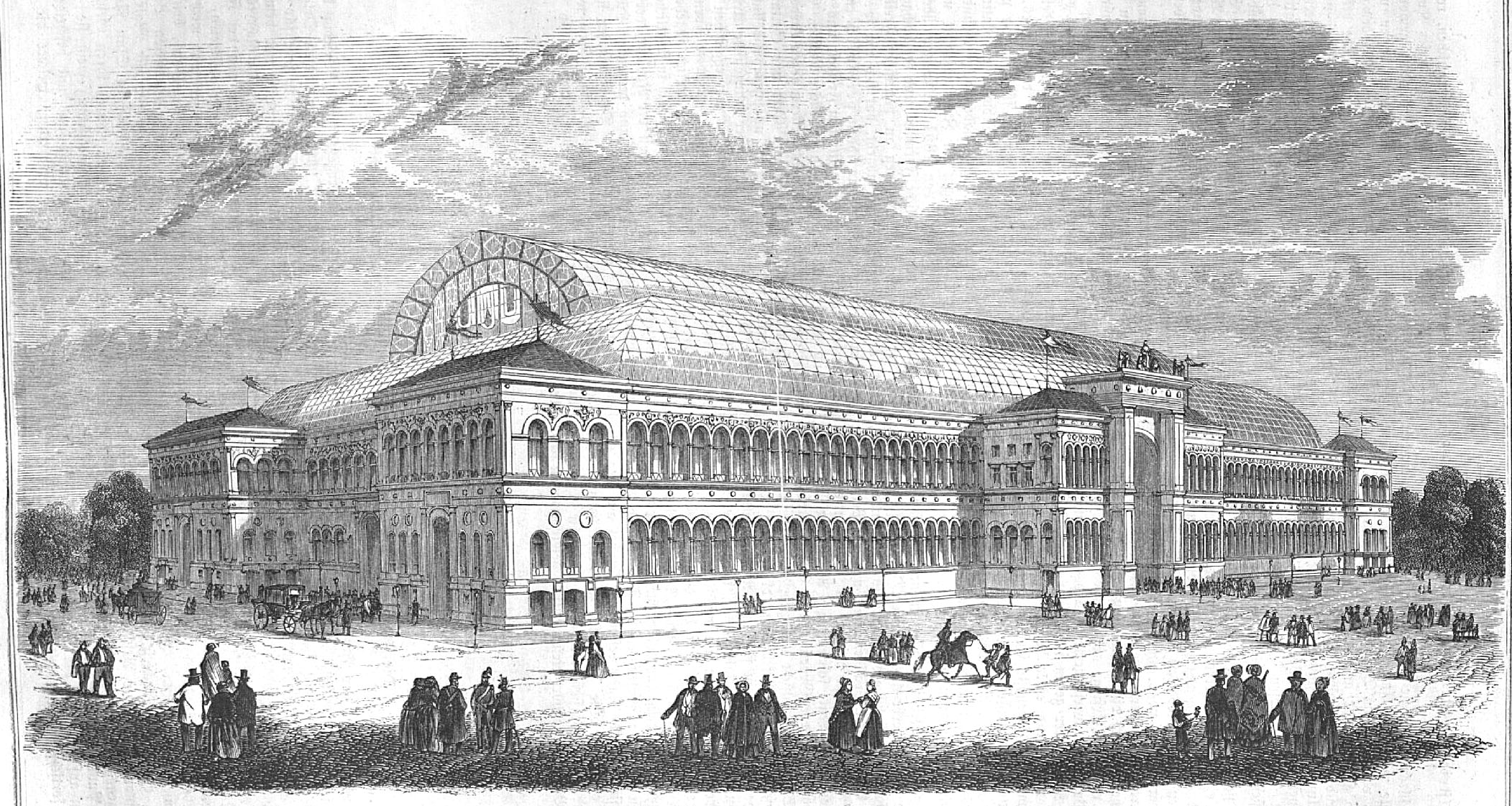
Palais de l'Industrie

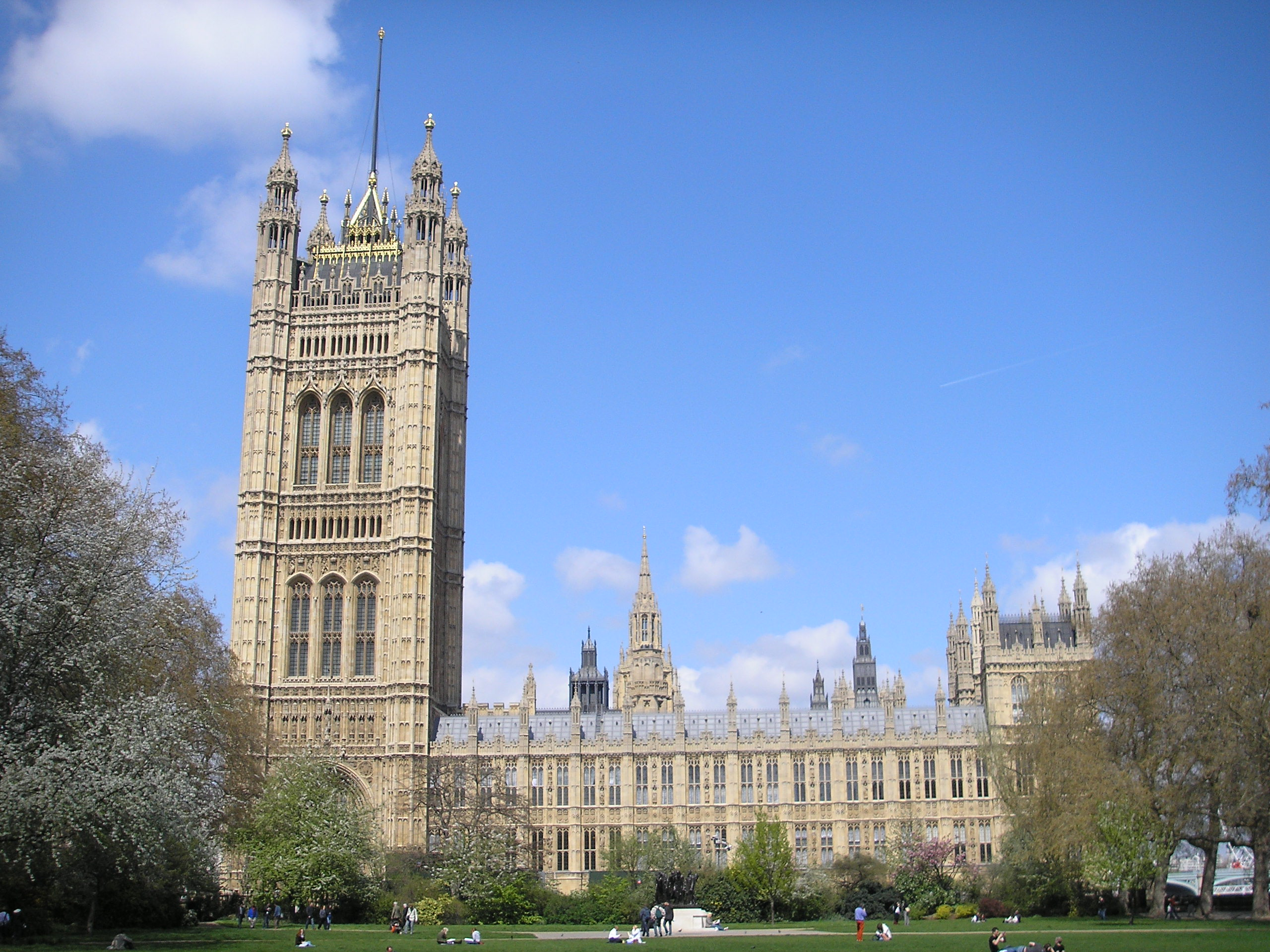
Victoria Tower

- The Palais de l'Industrie for the Exposition Universelle in Paris, France, mainly designed by the architect Jean-Marie-Victor Viel and the engineer Alexis Barrault.
- Église Saint-Eugène-Sainte-Cécile in Paris, designed by Louis-Auguste Boileau, is completed.
- Church of St John the Evangelist, Preston, Lancashire, England, designed by E. H. Shellard, is completed.
- The Old Stone Church (Cleveland, Ohio) in the United States, designed by Charles Heard and Simeon Porter.
- Church of Saint Bartholomew, Brugherio in Italy, rebuilt to the design of Giacomo Moraglia, is completed.
- St Mary's Cathedral, Killarney, Ireland (Roman Catholic), to the design of Augustus Pugin following his death, is consecrated.
- The Victoria Tower of the Palace of Westminster in London, England, as The King's Tower, designed by Charles Barry and Augustus Pugin.
- Neues Museum, Berlin, Prussia, designed by Friedrich August Stüler.
- The original Smithsonian Institution Building in Washington, D.C., to the 1846 design of James Renwick Jr.
- Fremantle Prison in Western Australia, opened.

== Awards ==
- RIBA Royal Gold Medal – Jacques Ignace Hittorff.
- Grand Prix de Rome, architecture – Honoré Daumet.

== Births ==
- May 12 – Alfred Gelder, English architect and politician active in Kingston upon Hull (died 1941)
- November 24 – Thomas Sully, self-trained American architect (died 1939)

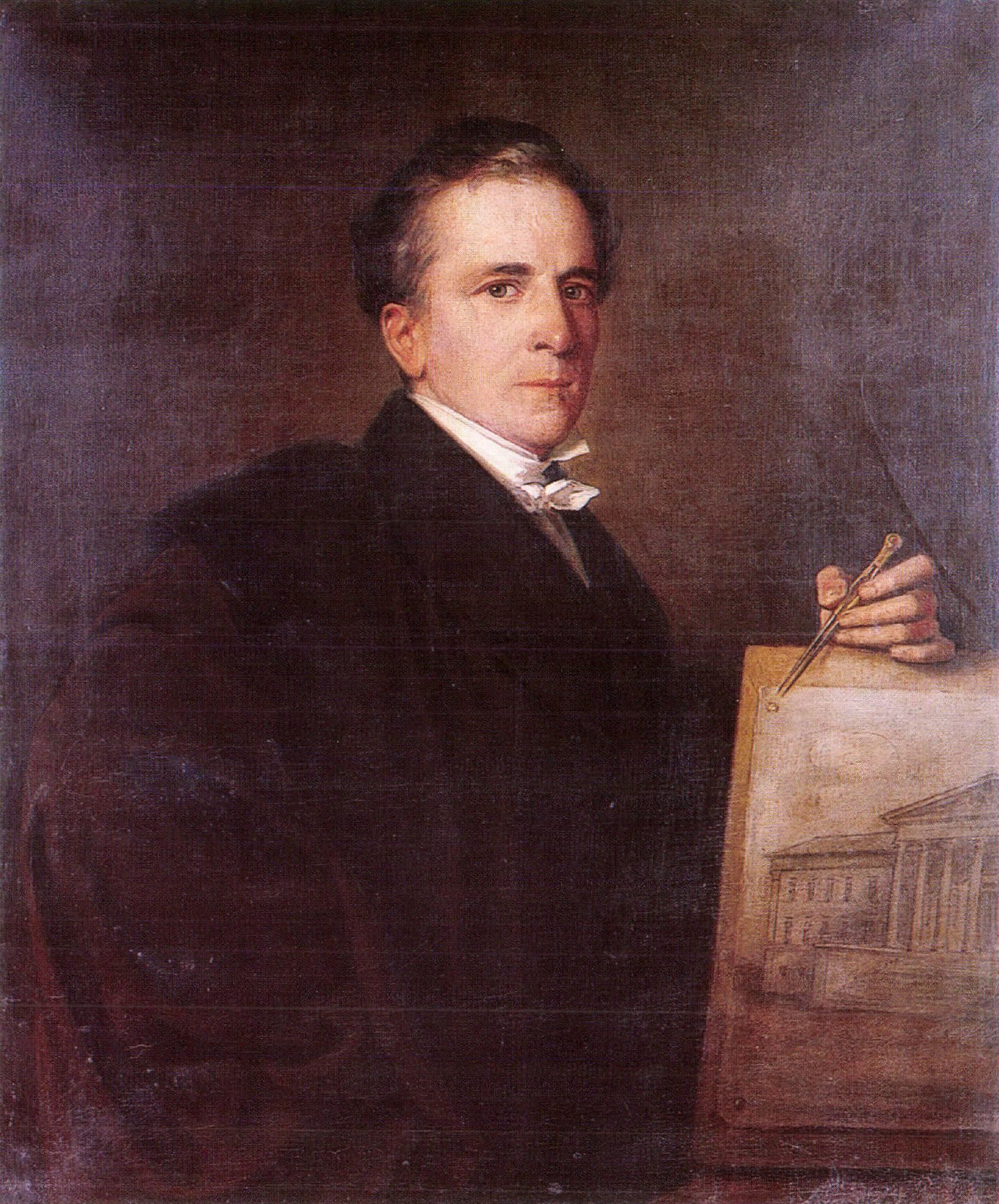
Mihály Pollack

== Deaths ==
- January 5 – Mihály Pollack, Austrian-born Neoclassical architect working in Pest, Hungary (born 1773)
- March 3 – Robert Mills, American architect, designer of the Washington Monument (born 1781)
- March 11 – James Gillespie Graham, Scottish architect (born 1776)
- March 27 – Richard Cromwell Carpenter, English ecclesiastical architect (born 1812)
- September 12 – John McCurdy, Irish architect, official architect to Trinity College, Dublin (born 1824)
- December 20 – Thomas Cubitt, English master builder (born 1785)
