= 1781 in architecture =

The year 1781 in architecture involved some significant architectural events and new buildings.

== Buildings and structures ==
=== Buildings ===
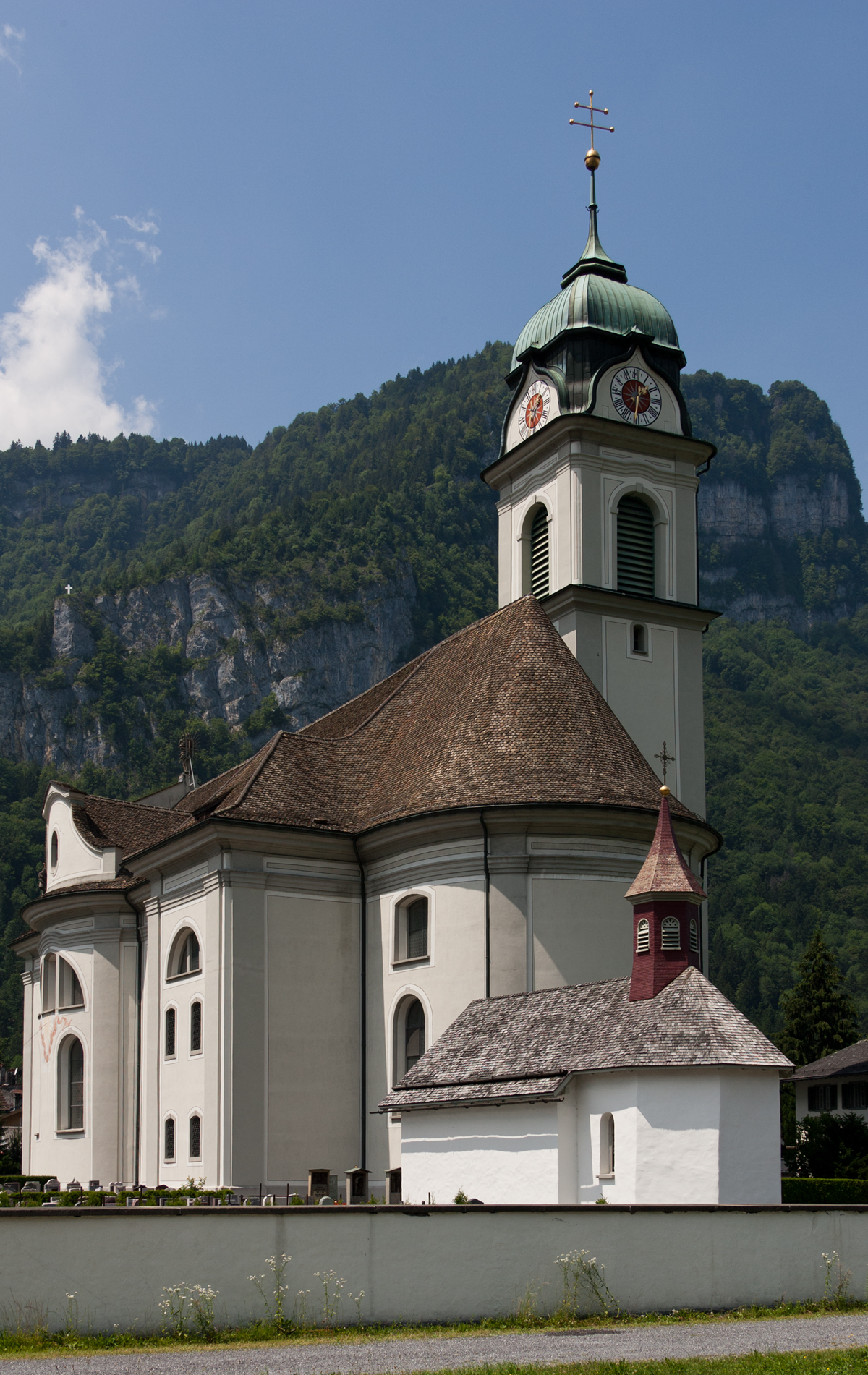
St. Hilarius Parish Church of Näfels, Switzerland

- Brizlee Tower, Alnwick, Northumberland, England, a folly erected for Hugh Percy, 1st Duke of Northumberland, possibly designed by Robert Adam
- St. Hilarius Parish Church of Näfels, Switzerland, designed by architects Johann Singer and Jakob Singer.
- Triumphal Arc, Kamianets-Podilskyi, Ukraine, built for the visit of Polish King Stanisław August Poniatowski to the city of Kamianets-Podilskyi.
- Sturehov Manor near Stockholm, designed by Carl Fredrik Adelcrantz, probably completed.
- Montagu House, Portman Square, London, designed by James Stuart, completed.

== Awards ==
- Grand Prix de Rome, architecture: Louis Combes.

== Births ==
- March 13 – Karl Friedrich Schinkel, Prussian architect, city planner, and painter (died 1841)
- August 12 – Robert Mills, possibly the first native-born American to train as a professional architect (died 1855)

== Deaths ==
- date unknown – Pietro Camporese the Elder, Italian architect (born 1726)
