= Zé Manel (footballer) =

Portuguese footballer

Personal information
- Full name: José Manuel da Silva Fernandes
- Date of birth: 22 February 1975 (age 51)
- Place of birth: Fraião, Portugal
- Height: 1.68 m (5 ft 6 in)
- Position: Winger

Youth career
- Maikes Fraião

Senior career*
| Years | Team | Apps | (Gls) |
| 1992–1996 | Maikes Fraião | | |
| 1996–1999 | Caçadores Taipas | 33 | (17) |
| 1999–2004 | Paços Ferreira | 136 | (27) |
| 2004–2007 | Boavista | 84 | (18) |
| 2007–2008 | Braga | 18 | (2) |
| 2008–2010 | Leixões | 56 | (7) |
| 2010–2012 | Trofense | 47 | (10) |
| 2012–2013 | Boavista | 26 | (3) |
| 2013–2015 | Caçadores Taipas | 56 | (18) |
| 2015–2016 | Académico Martim | 24 | (0) |
| Total | | 480 | (102) |
- * Club domestic league appearances and goals

José Manuel da Silva Fernandes (born 22 February 1975), commonly known as Zé Manel, is a Portuguese former professional footballer who played as a winger.

He amassed Primeira Liga totals of 270 matches and 51 goals over ten seasons, mainly in representation of Paços de Ferreira (four years) and Boavista (three).

== Club career ==
Zé Manel was born in Fraião, Braga District. He started playing professionally for Clube Caçadores das Taipas, moving from the Portuguese third division to the second as he joined F.C. Paços de Ferreira at the age of 24. In his debut season he contributed 24 games and three goals, helping the northerners to return to the Primeira Liga as league champions.

In the following years, Zé Manel continued to be a regular attacking unit for Paços: in his last season he scored on 11 occasions, not good enough, however, to avoid relegation. From 2004 to 2007 he represented Boavista FC, netting ten goals in his first year and also being a starter; the following campaign he joined S.C. Braga, being sparingly used.

For 2008–09, Zé Manel signed a one-year deal with top-flight strugglers Leixões SC. After two seasons of regular use – even though 30 of his league appearances were as a substitute– being relegated in his second, the 35-year-old moved to C.D. Trofense of division two, in late August 2010.

In August 2012, aged 37, Zé Manel returned to Boavista, with the club now in the third tier.

== Honours ==
Paços de Ferreira

- Segunda Liga: 1999–2000
