= St. Hilarius =

St. Hilarius may refer to:

== Saints ==
- Hilarius or Hilary of Poitiers (c. 310–c. 367), Bishop of Poitiers and Doctor of the Church
- Pope Hilarius (died 468), Catholic pope and saint
- Hilarius or Hilary of Arles (c. 403–449), Bishop of Arles and saint

== Other uses ==
- St. Hilarius Parish Church of Näfels, Näfels, Glarus Canton, Switzerland
