= 1773 in architecture =

The year 1773 in architecture involved some significant events.

== Events ==
- July 30 – Following the discovery of the iron waters in the civil parish of Fraião, archbishop D. Gaspar de Bragança orders the municipal council to proceed with the use of the waters. The municipal government contracts master mason Paulo Vidal (a resident of Adaúfe) to construct a fountain for 80$000 réis."for the people with better hygiene, comfort and seclusion to serve from the said water".
- Caspar Frederik Harsdorff is commissioned to redesign the Hercules Pavilion at Rosenborg Palace, Copenhagen, Denmark. His design with niches and statues gives the building its current name.
- Domenico Merlini becomes the Royal Architect in Poland.

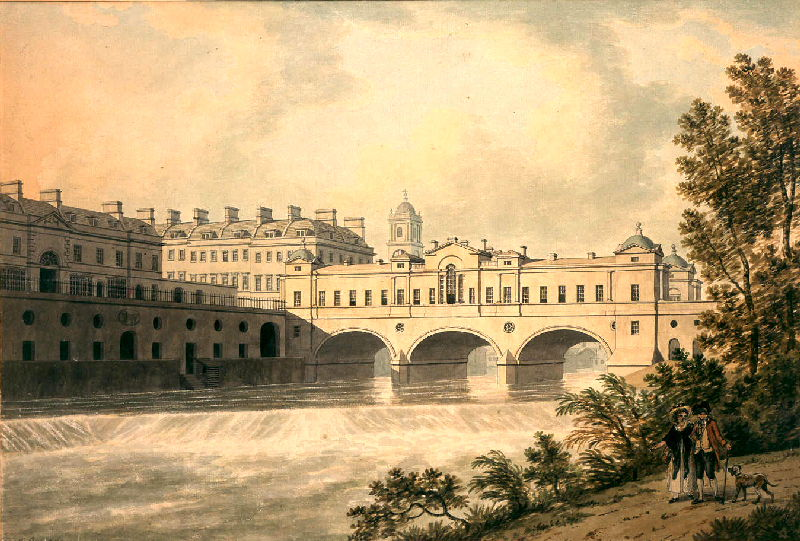
Pulteney Bridge, by Thomas Malton

== Buildings and structures ==
=== Buildings completed ===
- Pulteney Bridge in Bath, England, designed by Robert Adam.
- St. Hedwig's Cathedral, Berlin, Germany.

== Births ==
- August 30 – Mihály Pollack, Hungarian Neoclassical architect (died 1855)

== Deaths ==
- March 1 – Luigi Vanvitelli, Italian engineer and architect (born 1700)
