= List of cultural property of national significance in Switzerland: Glarus =

This list contains all cultural property of national significance (class A) in the canton of Glarus from the 2009 Swiss Inventory of Cultural Property of National and Regional Significance. It is sorted by municipality and contains 30 individual buildings, 7 collections and 4 archaeological finds.

The geographic coordinates provided are in the Swiss coordinate system as given in the Inventory.

== Glarus ==
KGS No.^{?}	Picture	Name	Street Address	CH1903 X coordinate	CH1903 Y coordinate	Location
9609	Old City, Medieval / Early Modern City	Old City, Medieval / Early Modern City		723.950	211.300	47.04114°N 9.069706°E
2701	Glarus railway station building, goods shed, locomotive shed and turntable	Glarus railway station building, goods shed, locomotive shed and turntable	Bahnhofplatz	724.086	211.166	47.039909°N 9.071459°E
2690; 8804; 9331	Former High School, Cantonal Library and Cantonal Archive	Former High School, Cantonal Library and Cantonal Archive	Hauptstrasse 60	723.752	211.331	47.041456°N 9.06711°E
2691	Courthouse with Side Pavillons	Courthouse with Side Pavillons	Spielhof 6	723.734	211.397	47.042053°N 9.066891°E
2692	Brunner House	Brunner House	Im Sand 9	723.766	211.085	47.039241°N 9.067227°E
2693	House in der Wiese	House in der Wiese	Wiesli 5	723.447	211.405	47.042178°N 9.063118°E
2694		Schuler-Ganzoni House with Parking Structure	Gerichtshausstrasse 58	723.507	211.250	47.040773°N 9.063865°E
2724	Cantonal Armory (Zeughaus)	Cantonal Armory (Zeughaus)	Landstrasse 38	723.414	211.630	47.044208°N 9.062745°E
2696	Art Museum	Art Museum	Volksgarten	724.086	211.023	47.038623°N 9.07142°E
2698	Swiss Reformed City Church with Reformed and Catholic Rectory	Swiss Reformed City Church with Reformed and Catholic Rectory	Sandstrasse	723.625	211.192	47.040229°N 9.065402°E
2676		Factory Complex Jenny & Co. with Comptoir	Ennenda, Fabrikstrasse 7, 9	724.370	210.878	47.037266°N 9.075116°E
9301		G.T. Mandl-Foundation Library	Netstal, Kreuzbühlstrasse 68	723.045	213.866	47.064385°N 9.058498°E
2786		Powerplant am Löntsch	Netstal	722.350	212.980	47.056546°N 9.049112°E
2791		Stähli House	Netstal, Grünhag 30	722.346	213.200	47.058525°N 9.049118°E
Unknown		ISOS Stadt: Glarus				
Unknown		ISOS Urbanized Village: Ennenda				

== Glarus Nord ==
KGS No.^{?}	Picture	Name	Street Address	CH1903 X coordinate	CH1903 Y coordinate	Location
2650	Herrensitz Milt (Elsener House)	Herrensitz Milt (Elsener House)	Bilten, Elsenerstrasse 12	720.170	222.810	47.145347°N 9.023037°E
2689	Vor dem Wald (Roman Watchtower)	Vor dem Wald (Roman Watchtower)	Filzbach	727.460	220.300	47.121411°N 9.118416°E
2751	Herrensitz Haltli	Herrensitz Haltli	Mollis, Kerenzerstrasse 19	724.227	217.694	47.09859°N 9.075105°E
Unknown		Hof and Höfli with Gartenpavillon	Mollis, Steinackerstrasse 4	724.263	216.692	47.089572°N 9.075304°E
2752	Zwicky House	Zwicky House	Mollis, Vorderdorfstrasse 59	724.201	216.726	47.089889°N 9.074497°E
2764		Hammerschmiede	Mühlehorn, Kohlplatz	731.529	219.761	47.115768°N 9.171868°E
2767; 8511	Freuler Palace and Museum of Glarus	Freuler Palace and Museum of Glarus	Näfels, Bahnhofstrasse 2	723.343	217.750	47.099258°N 9.063479°E
2768	Catholic Church St. Hilarius	Catholic Church St. Hilarius	Näfels	723.380	217.890	47.100511°N 9.064004°E
2769	Letzi (Medieval Fortifications)	Letzi (Medieval Fortifications)	Näfels	723.480	217.980	47.101301°N 9.065346°E
2797		Industrial Plant and Settlement for Jenny & Co.	Niederurnen, Ziegelbrücke	723.165	221.512	47.133123°N 9.06216°E
Unknown		ISOS Village: Mollis				
Unknown		ISOS Urbanized Village: Näfels				
Unknown	ISOS Special Case: Factory Site, Ziegelbrücke	ISOS Special Case: Factory Site, Ziegelbrücke				

== Glarus Süd ==
KGS No.^{?}	Picture	Name	Street Address	CH1903 X coordinate	CH1903 Y coordinate	Location
9608		Bergeten, Ruins of a Medieval Alpine Camp	Braunwald	716.500	200.190	46.942574°N 8.968846°E
2654	Ortstockhaus	Ortstockhaus	Braunwald, Braunwaldalp Unterstafel	717.083	200.820	46.948137°N 8.976663°E
2661	Gross House	Gross House	Elm, Dorfstrasse	732.050	197.937	46.919403°N 9.172376°E
2669	Suworow House	Suworow House	Elm, Dorf	732.073	197.993	46.919902°N 9.172695°E
2662	Zentner House	Zentner House	Elm, Dorfstrasse	732.009	197.897	46.919052°N 9.171827°E
8597	Naturwissenschaftliche Sammlungen Des Kantons Glarus, Engi	Naturwissenschaftliche Sammlungen; Des Kantons Glarus, Engi	Engi, Bergen	730.340	205.288	46.985849°N 9.15204°E
2725		Spinnerei Daniel Jenny & Co	Haslen	723.350	205.000	46.984595°N 9.0601°E
2729	Pantenbrücke (Bridge)	Pantenbrücke (Bridge)	Linthal	717.650	192.020	46.868894°N 8.981836°E
2655		Sunnezyt House	Luchsingen, Hauptstrasse 18	721.048	201.010	46.949135°N 9.028785°E
2740	Brummbach House	Brummbach House	Matt, Brummbach 36	731.791	201.823	46.954402°N 9.170103°E
11741	Steggut House	Steggut House	Matt, Brummbach 21	731.757	201.747	46.953725°N 9.169634°E
2742	Schiffmeister House (Schönenberger House)	Schiffmeister House (Schönenberger House)	Mitlödi, Rain 3	724.657	207.877	47.010224°N 9.078066°E
8598		Industrial Archives of Glarus	Schwanden, Mühlestrasse 19 / Iii	724.691	206.089	46.994138°N 9.078022°E
Unknown		ISOS Dorf: Elm				
Unknown		ISOS Weiler: Steinibach				
Unknown		ISOS Dorf: Diesbach				
Unknown		ISOS Weiler: Adlenbach				
Unknown		ISOS Dorf: Rüti				
