= 1700 in architecture =

The year 1700 in architecture involved some significant events.

== Events ==
- March 27 – François de Rohan, prince de Soubise, buys the Hôtel de Clisson, which is subsequently remodelled by Pierre-Alexis Delamair.
- A new facade is built on the Cathedral Basilica of St. Peter Apostle at Frascati, Italy.

== Buildings and structures ==
=== Buildings completed ===
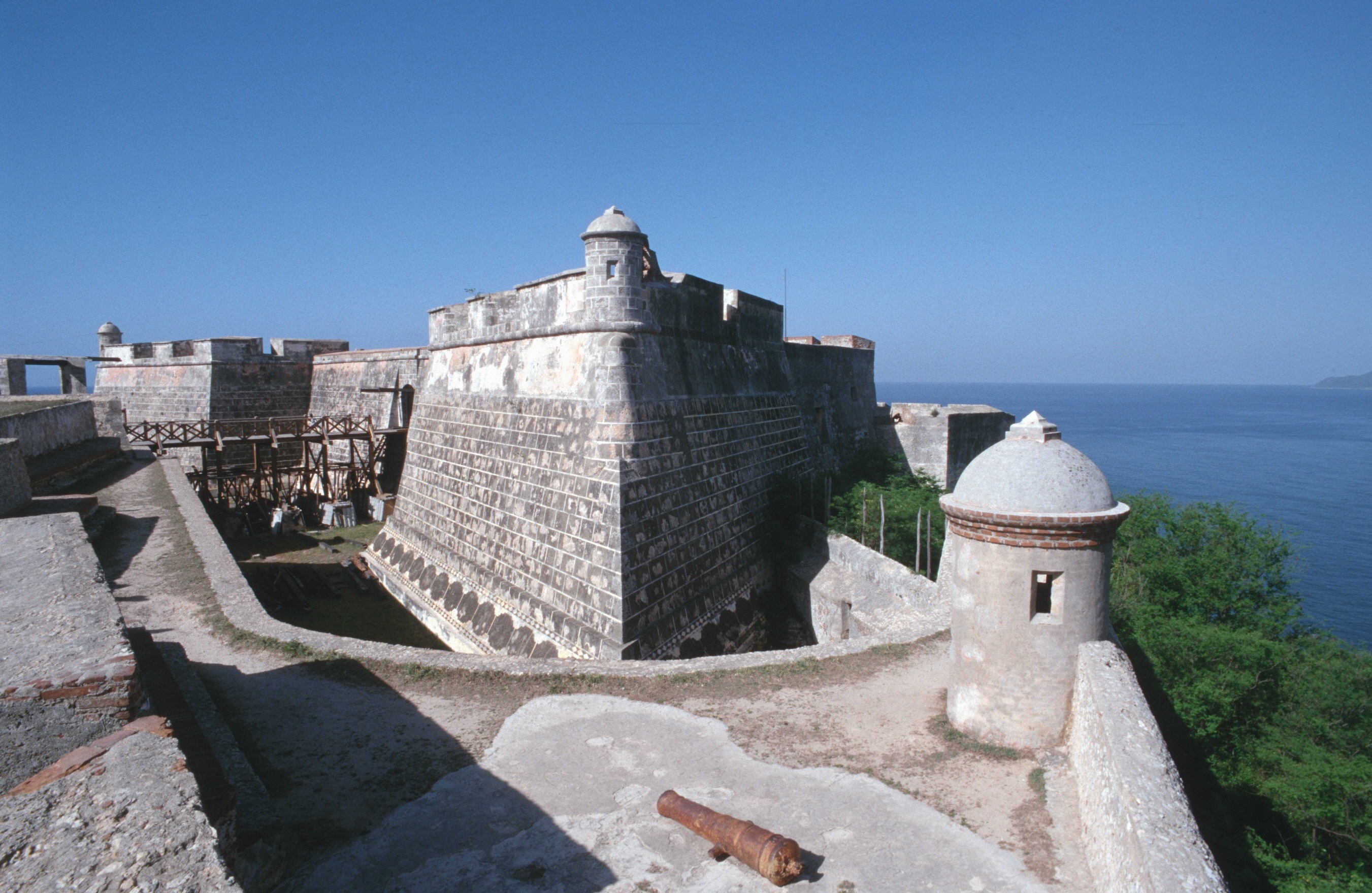
Castillo de San Pedro de la Roca, Santiago de Cuba

- Brown House, Rehoboth, Massachusetts, USA
- Castillo de San Pedro de la Roca, Santiago de Cuba (begun 1638), by Giovanni Battista Antonelli
- DeWint House, Tappan, New York, USA, by Daniel DeClark
- Federal Hall, New York City
- Hill Court Manor, Ross-on-Wye, England
- Rossie House, Angus, Scotland, by Alexander Edward
- Slushko Palace, Vilnius, Lithuania (begun c.1690), by Giovanni Pietro Perti
- Tessin Palace, Stockholm (begun 1694), by Nicodemus Tessin the Younger
- Upper Chapel, Sheffield, England, by followers of Timothy Jollie
- Wren Building, College of William & Mary, Williamsburg, Virginia, USA (begun 1695)

== Births ==
- May 12 – Luigi Vanvitelli, Italian architect (died 1773)
- August 27 – Carl Hårleman, Swedish architect (died 1753)
- date unknown
  - Santiago Bonavía, Italian architect and painter (died 1760)
  - Bartolomeo Rastrelli (died 1771)

== Deaths ==
- September 15 – André Le Nôtre, French landscape architect (born 1613)
- date unknown – Hans van Steenwinckel the Youngest, Danish architect and sculptor (born 1639)
