= 1771 in architecture =

The year 1771 in architecture involved some significant events.

== Buildings and structures ==
=== Buildings ===
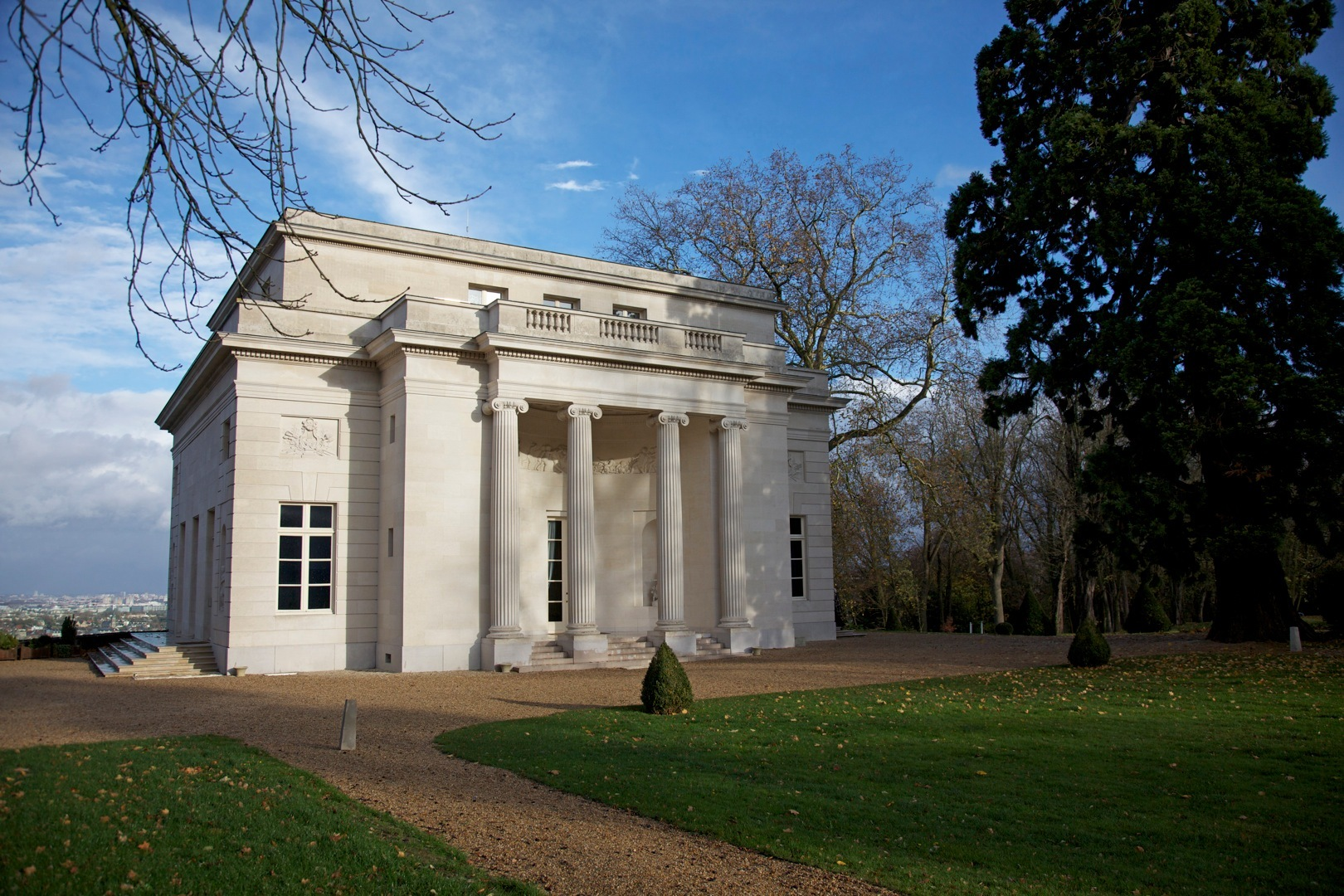
Pavillon de Louveciennes

- Bath Assembly Rooms, designed by John Wood the Younger, completed in England.
- Claydon House, the second English country house completed on this site in Buckinghamshire.
- Harewood House in West Yorkshire, England, a country house designed by John Carr and Robert Adam, is completed.
- Pavillon de Louveciennes in Louveciennes, Yvelines, France, designed by Claude Nicolas Ledoux, is completed.
- Putuo Zongcheng Temple of Chengde, Hebei province, China is completed.
- Thatched House Lodge in the (modern-day) London Borough of Richmond upon Thames is remodelled as a royal residence by John Soane.
- Ornamental temple (a folly) on Temple Island in the River Thames near Henley in England, designed by James Wyatt, is built.
- Second phase of building the new Stockholm Palace is completed by Carl Fredrik Adelcrantz.
- Façade of church of San Rocco, Venice, designed by Bernardino Maccarucci, completed.

== Births ==
- Joseph Gandy, English architectural artist and architect (died 1843)

== Deaths ==
- February 21 – Filippo Raguzzini, Italian architect (born 1690)
- April 29 – Francesco Bartolomeo Rastrelli, French-born Italian architect working in Saint Petersburg (born 1700)
- William Baker of Audlem, English architect (born 1705)
- Edmund Woolley, English-born American architect and master carpenter (born c.1695)
