= Nogueira, Fraião e Lamaçães =

- Civil parish
- Location in Portugal
- Coordinates: 41.528°N 8.413°W
- Country: Portugal
- Region: Norte
- Intermunic. comm.: Cávado
- District: Braga
- Municipality: Braga

Area
  - Total: 8.40 km^{2} (3.24 sq mi)

Population (2011)
  - Total: 13,054
  - Density: 1,600/km^{2} (4,000/sq mi)
- Time zone: UTC+00:00 (WET)
  - Summer (DST): UTC+01:00 (WEST)

Nogueira, Fraião e Lamaçães is a civil parish in the municipality of Braga, Portugal. It was formed in 2013 by the merger of the former parishes Nogueira, Fraião and Lamaçães. The population in 2011 was 13,054, in an area of 8.40 km^{2}. The Fountain of Águas Ferreas is situated in the village Fraião.

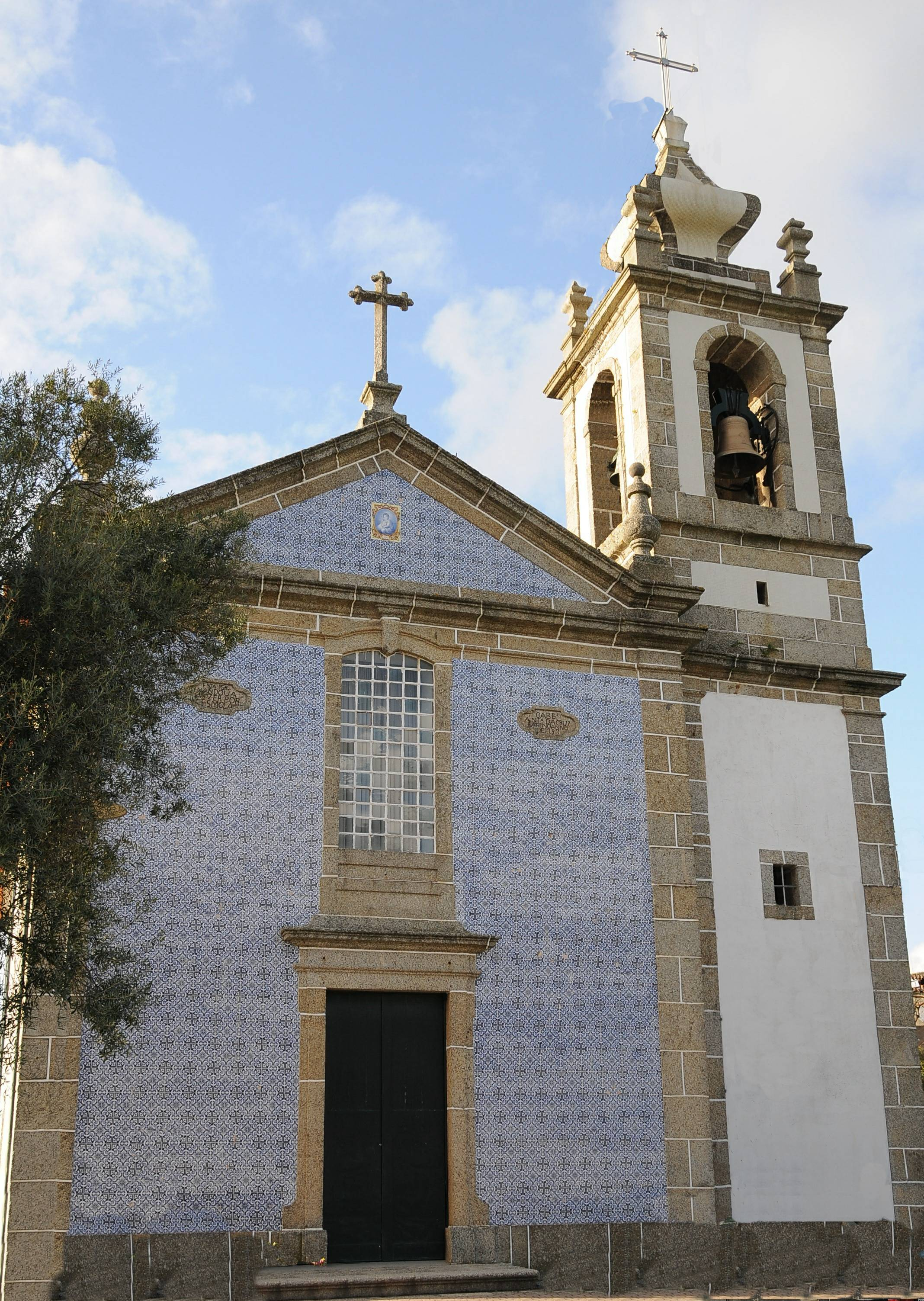
Nogueira Church

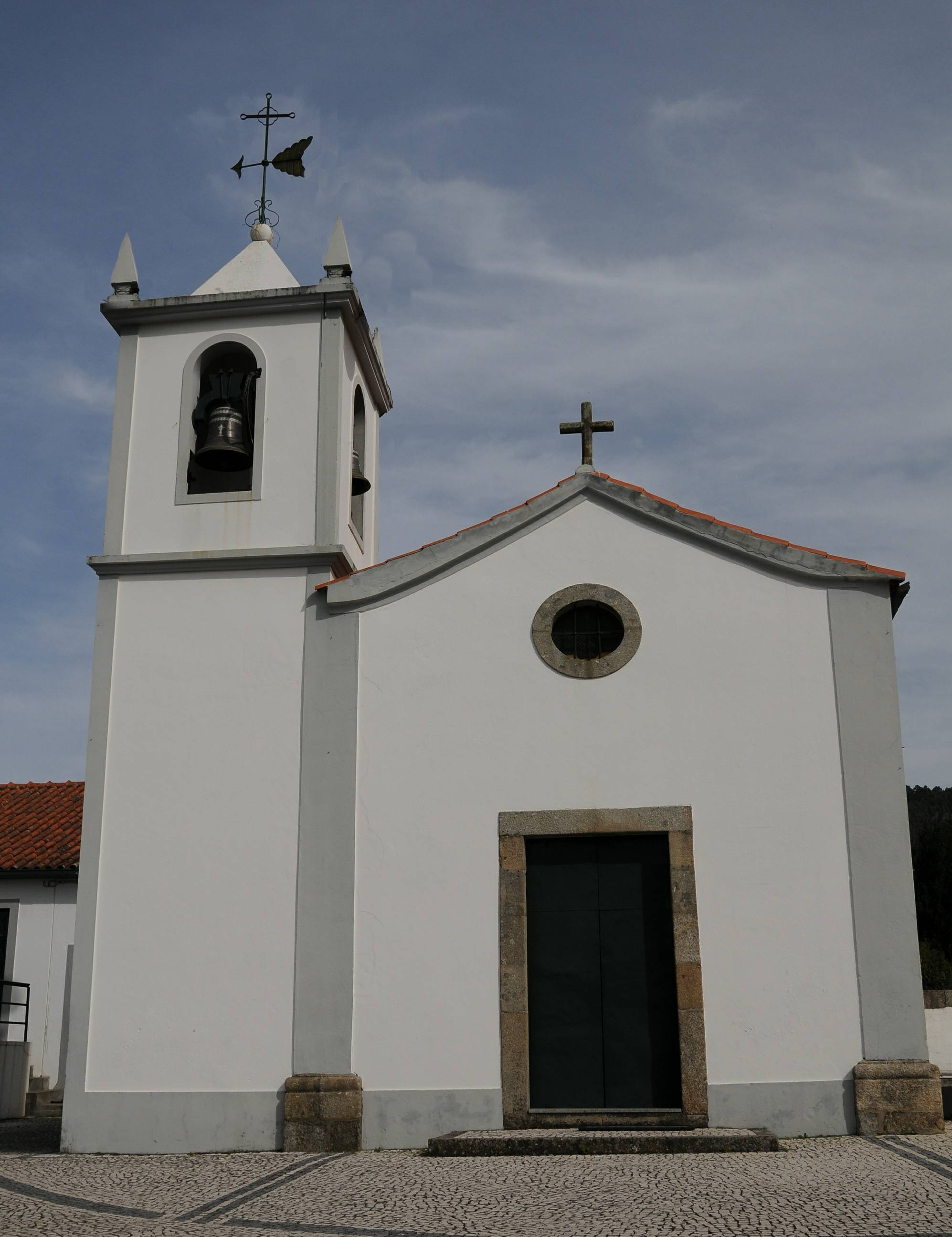
Fraião Church

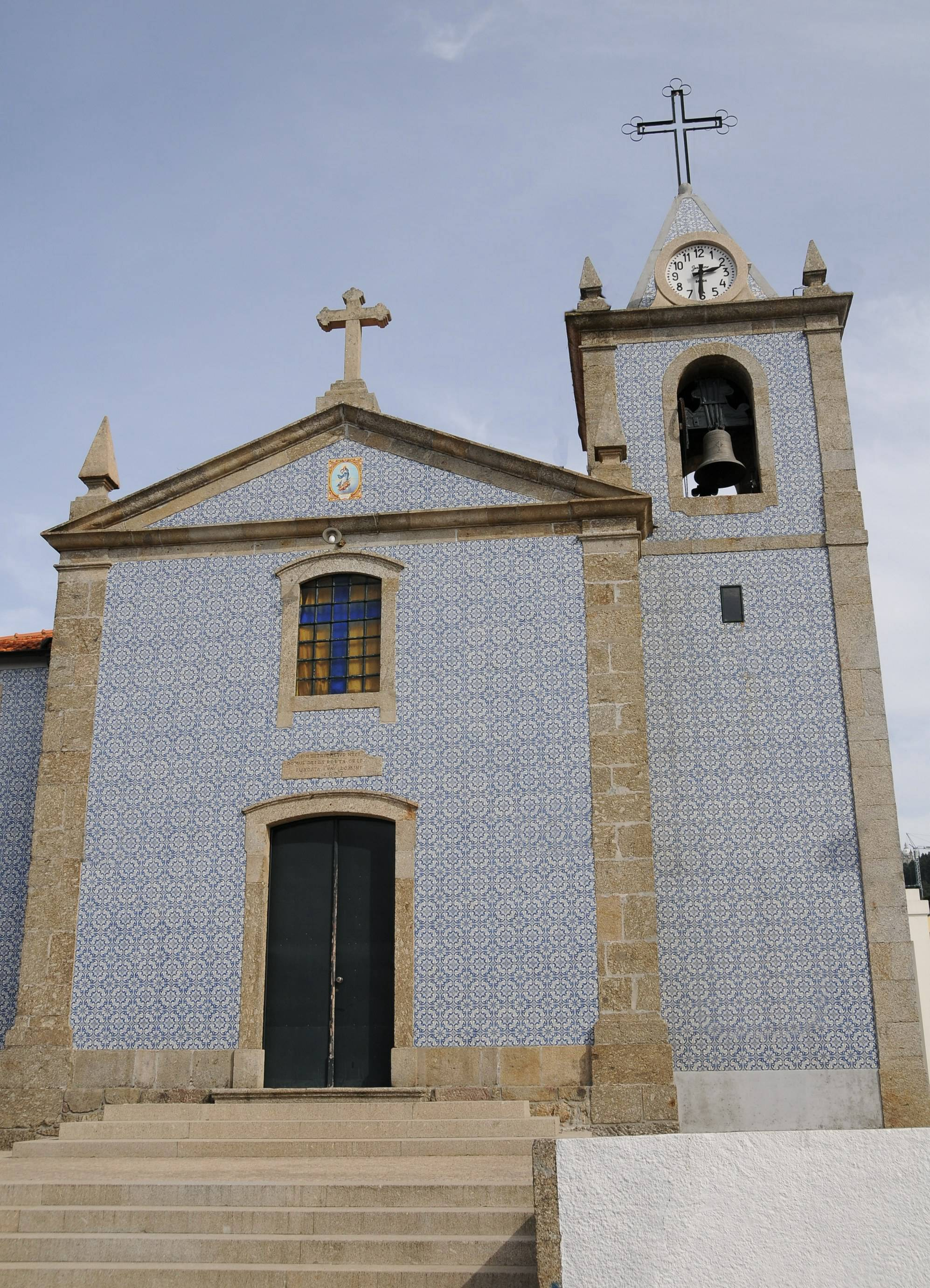
Lamaçães Church
