= Exposition Universelle (1855) =

World's Fair held in Paris, France, from 15 May to 15 November 1855

1855 Paris
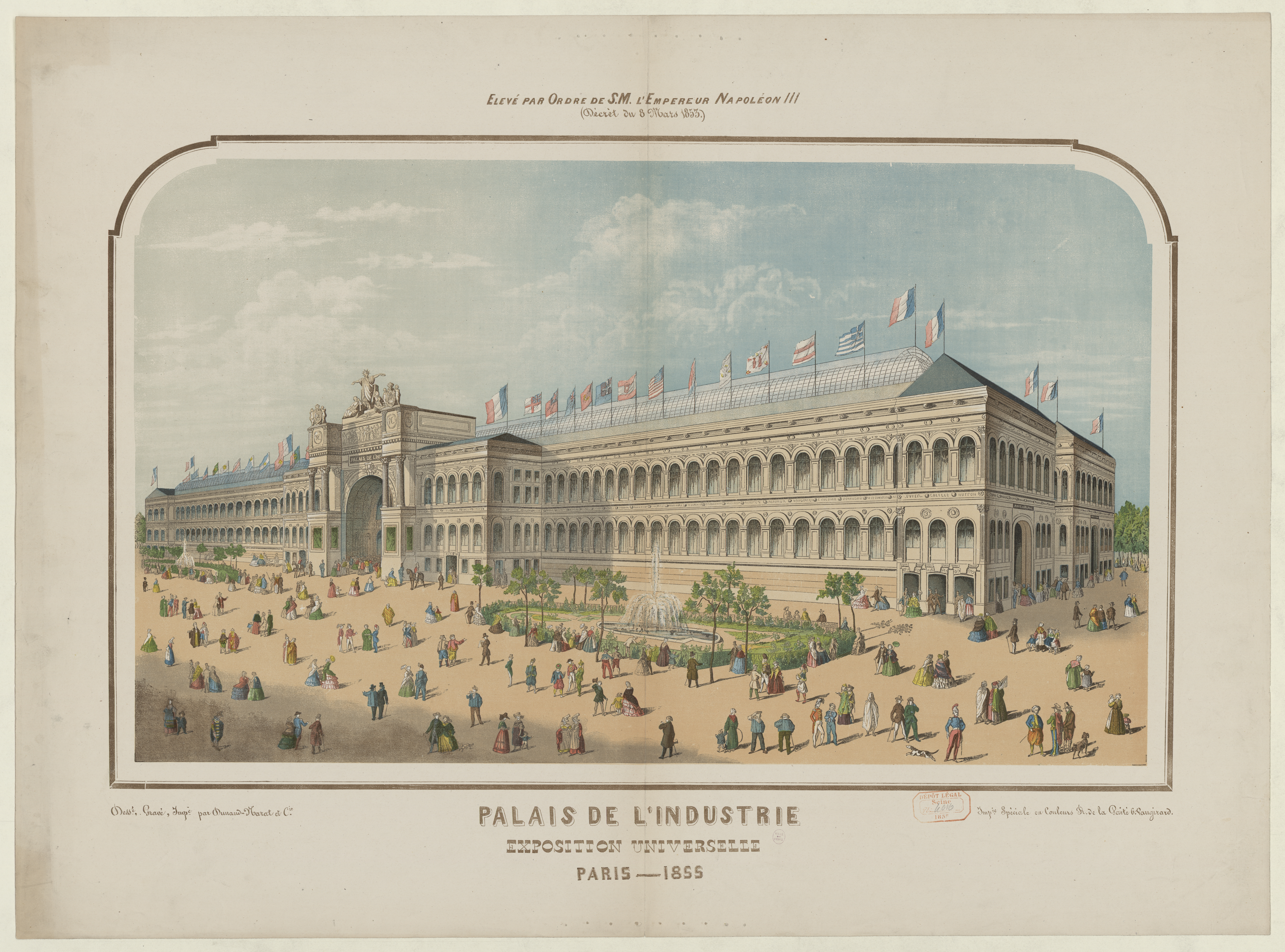
- Palais de l'Industrie

Overview
- BIE-class: Universal exposition
- Category: Historical Expo
- Name: Exposition Universelle des produits de l'Agriculture, de l'Industrie et des Beaux-Arts de Paris 1855
- Building(s): Palais de l'Industrie
- Area: 15.2 hectares (38 acres)
- Visitors: 5,162,330

Participant(s)
- Countries: 27

Location
- Country: France
- City: Paris
- Venue: Jardins des Champs-Élysées
- Coordinates: 48°52′0″N 2°18′47″E

Timeline
- Opening: 15 May 1855; 171 years ago
- Closure: 15 November 1855; 171 years ago

Universal expositions
- Previous: Great Exhibition in London
- Next: 1862 International Exhibition in London

The Exposition Universelle of 1855 (French pronunciation: [ɛkspozisjɔ̃ ynivɛʁsɛl]), better known in English as the 1855 Paris Exposition, was a world's fair held on the Champs-Élysées in Paris, France, from 15 May to 15 November 1855. Its full official title was the Exposition Universelle des produits de l'Agriculture, de l'Industrie et des Beaux-Arts de Paris 1855. It was the first of ten major expositions held in the city between 1855 and 1937. (Note: This includes six world expositions (in 1855, 1867, 1878, 1889, 1900 and 1937), two specialized expositions (in 1881 and 1925) and two colonial expositions (in 1907 and 1931).)

Much of the physical evidence of the exposition has been destroyed or lost, including the original Champs-Élysées rotunda of the Théâtre du Rond-Point. A replacement panorama, Le Panorama National, was designed by architect Gabriel Davioud in 1860 for the corner of the Avenue d'Antin (now Avenue Franklin D. Roosevelt) and Champs-Élysées. However, some pieces remain, such as a group of limestone sculptures, France Crowning Art and Industry, which adorned the Palais de l'Industrie and were kept intact by moving them to the Saint-Cloud park during the building's demolition in 1900. Also, by some accounts, the Notre-Dame-du-Travail church reused the framework from the Palais de l'Industrie as its interior, leaving the steel beams and rivets fully exposed.

== History ==
The exposition was a major event in France, then newly under the reign of Emperor Napoleon III. It followed London's Great Exhibition of 1851 and attempted to surpass that fair's Crystal Palace with its own Palais de l'Industrie.

According to its official report, 5,162,330 visitors attended the exposition, of whom about 4.2 million entered the industrial exposition and 900,000 entered the Beaux Arts exposition. Expenses amounted to upward of $5,000,000, while receipts were scarcely one-tenth of that amount. The exposition covered 16 hectares (40 acres) with 34 countries participating.

For the exposition, Napoleon III requested a classification system for France's best Bordeaux wines which were to be on display for visitors from around the world. Brokers from the wine industry ranked the wines according to a château's reputation and trading price, which at that time was directly related to quality. The result was the important Bordeaux Wine Official Classification of 1855.

== Inventions and Innovations ==
The 1855 exposition featured many early versions of modern inventions housed in the Palais de l'Industrie, a large Gothic building designed chiefly by the architect Jean-Marie-Victor Viel and the engineer Alexis Barrault, and crowned by the sculpture group France Crowning Art and Industry by Élias Robert. The exposition featured the first ever lawn mower, Moore's washing machine, the first non-industrial sewing machine, one of the first oil-powered vehicles, Samuel Colt’s revolver, and Edouard Loysel de Santais’ hydrostatic percolator which could produce 50,000 cups of coffee in a day.

== Fine arts ==
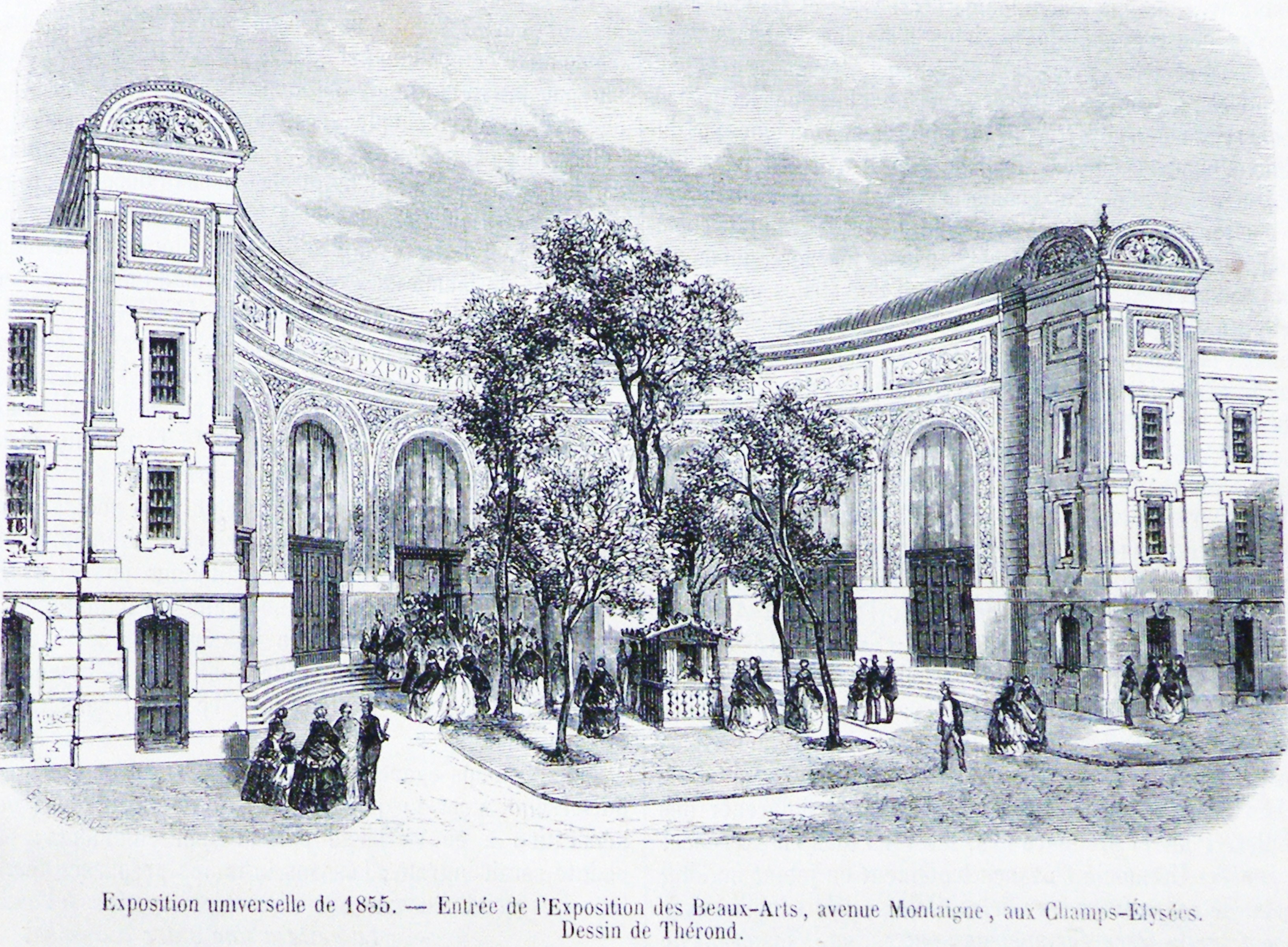
Palace of Fine Arts

The arts were shown in a separate pavilion on Avenue Montaigne, designed by French architect Hector Lefuel. There were works from artists from 29 countries, including French artists François Rude, Ingres, Delacroix and Henri Lehmann, and British artists William Holman Hunt and John Everett Millais. However Gustave Courbet, having had several of his paintings rejected (for example, The Meeting and The Painter's Studio), exhibited around forty of his works in a temporary Pavillon du Réalisme adjacent to the official show; this was a forerunner of the various Salon des Refusés.

The French art critic Charles Baudelaire wrote three articles on the Exhibition, brought together in the posthumous work Curiosités esthétiques.

== Gallery ==
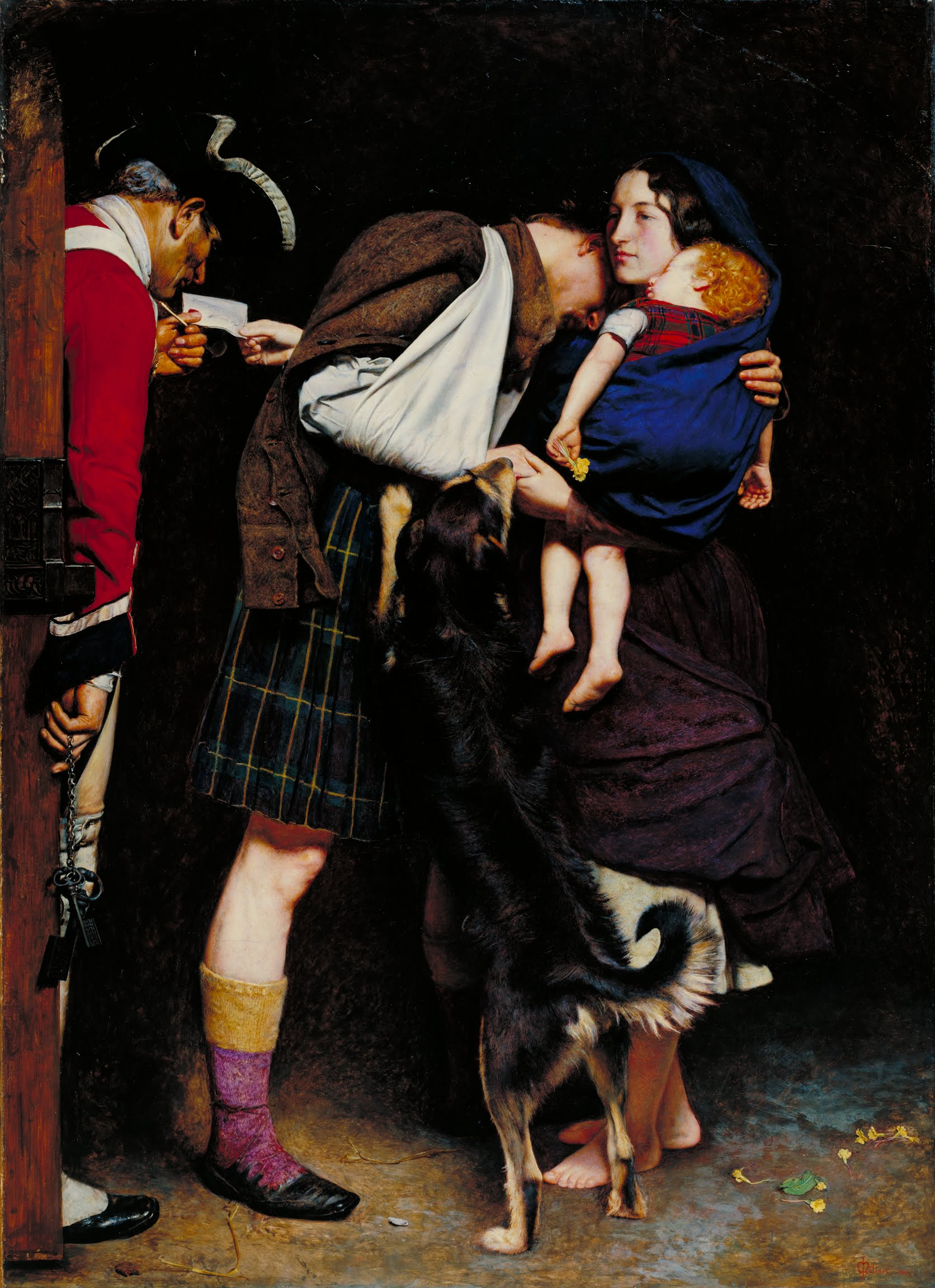
The Order of Release, 1746 by John Everett Millais

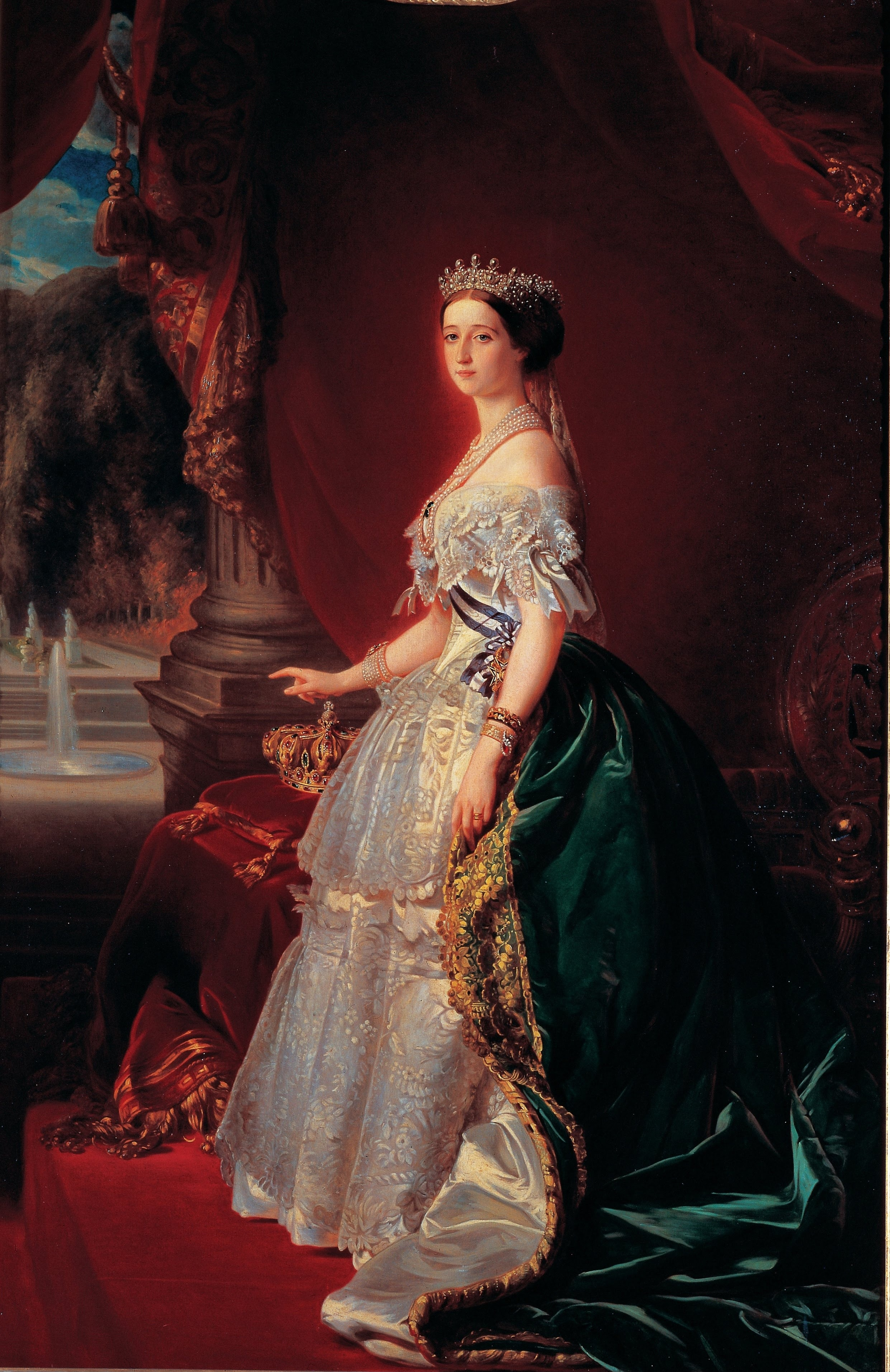
Portrait of Empress Eugénie by Franz Xaver Winterhalter

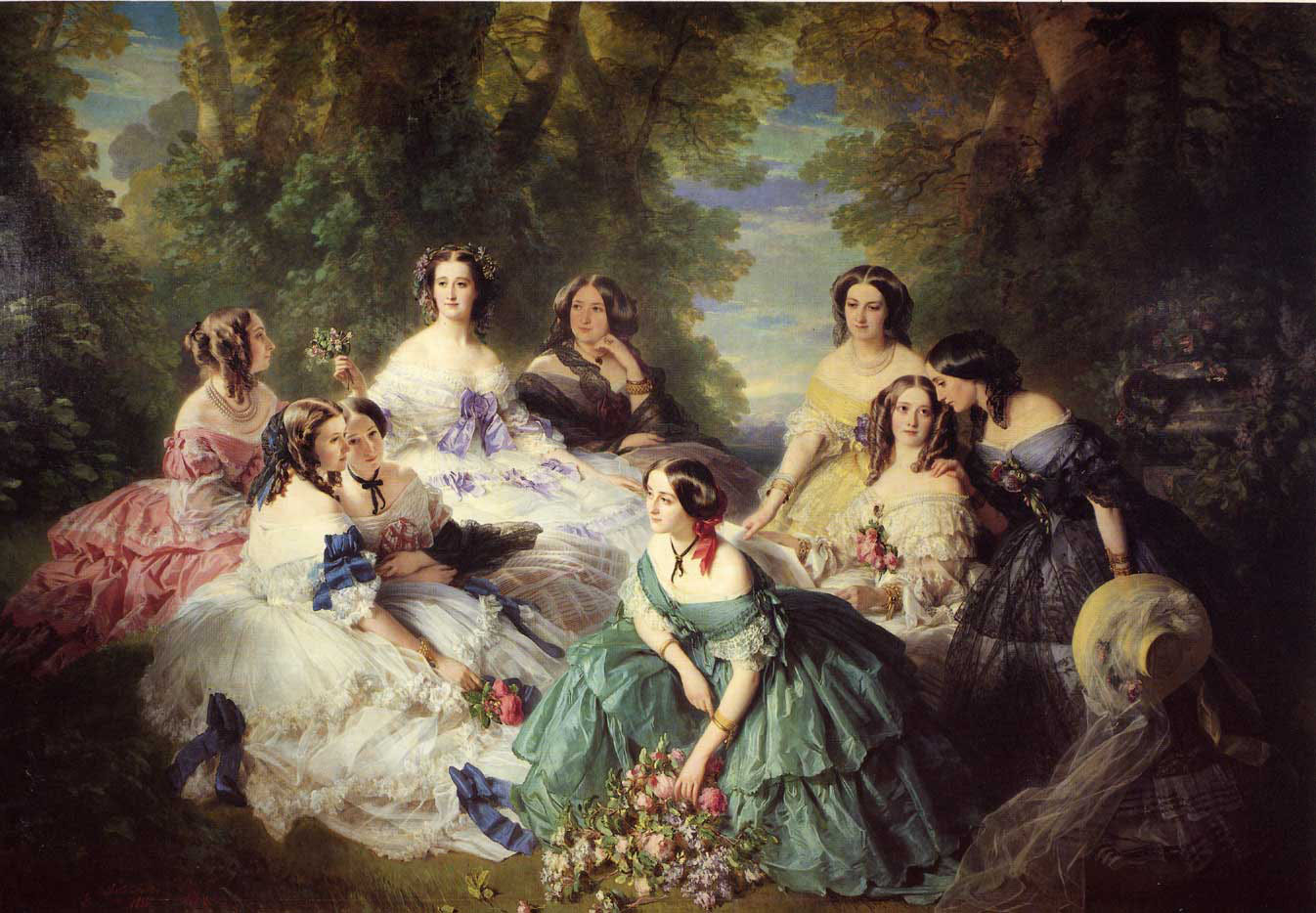
Empress Eugénie Surrounded by her Ladies in Waiting by Franz Xaver Winterhalter

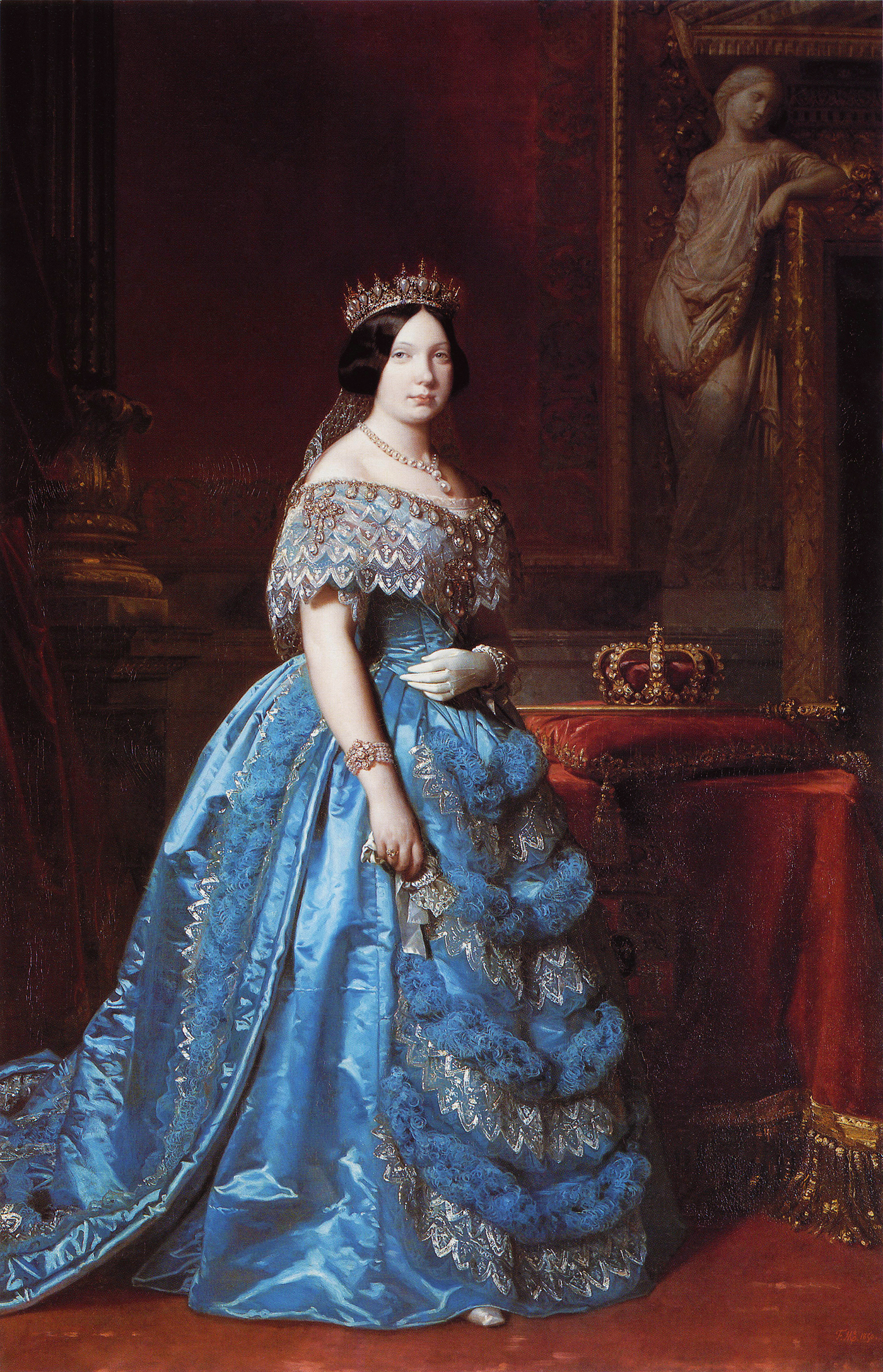
Portrait of Isabella II of Spain by Federico de Madrazo y Kuntz

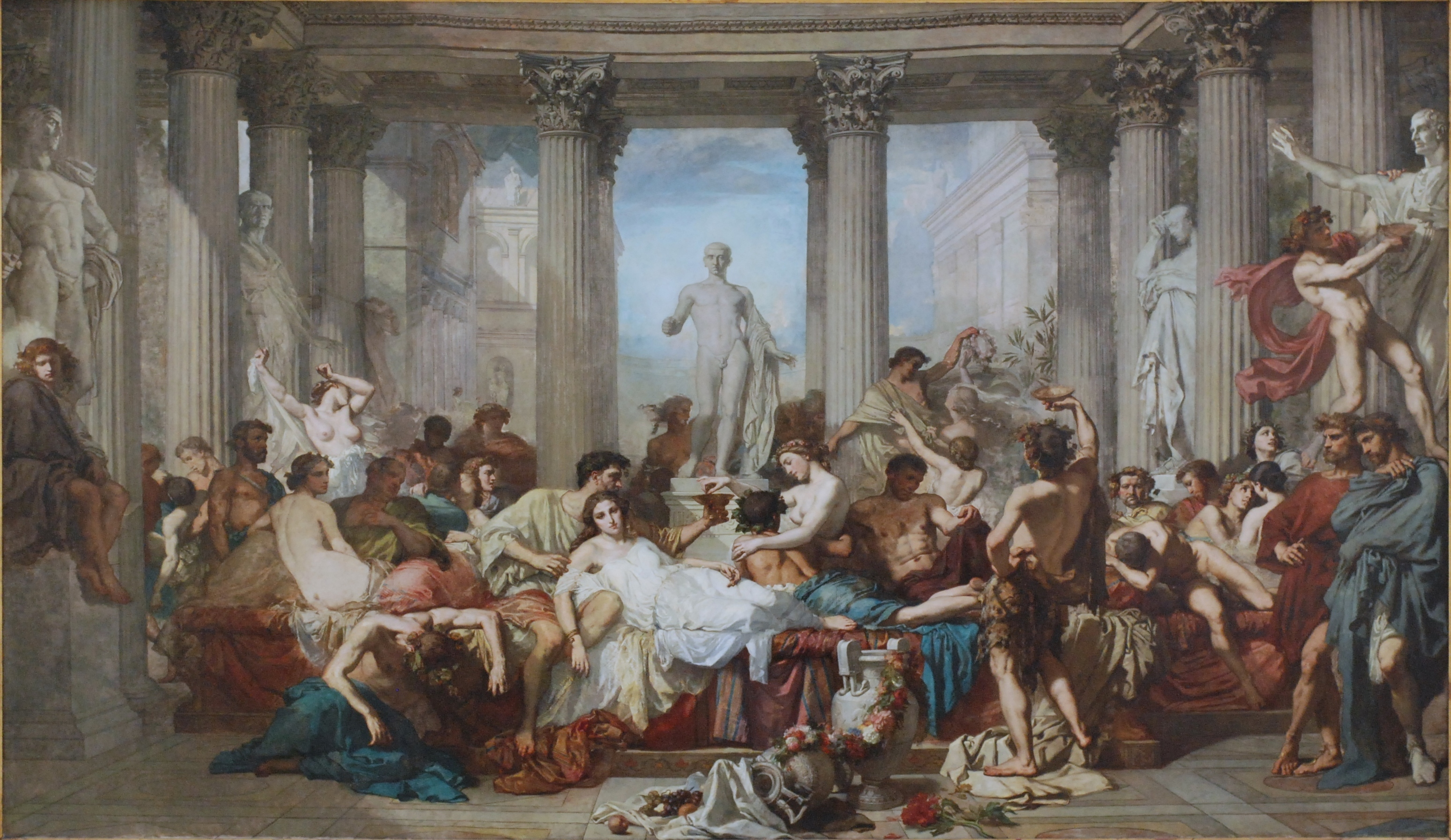
Romans during the Decadence by Thomas Couture

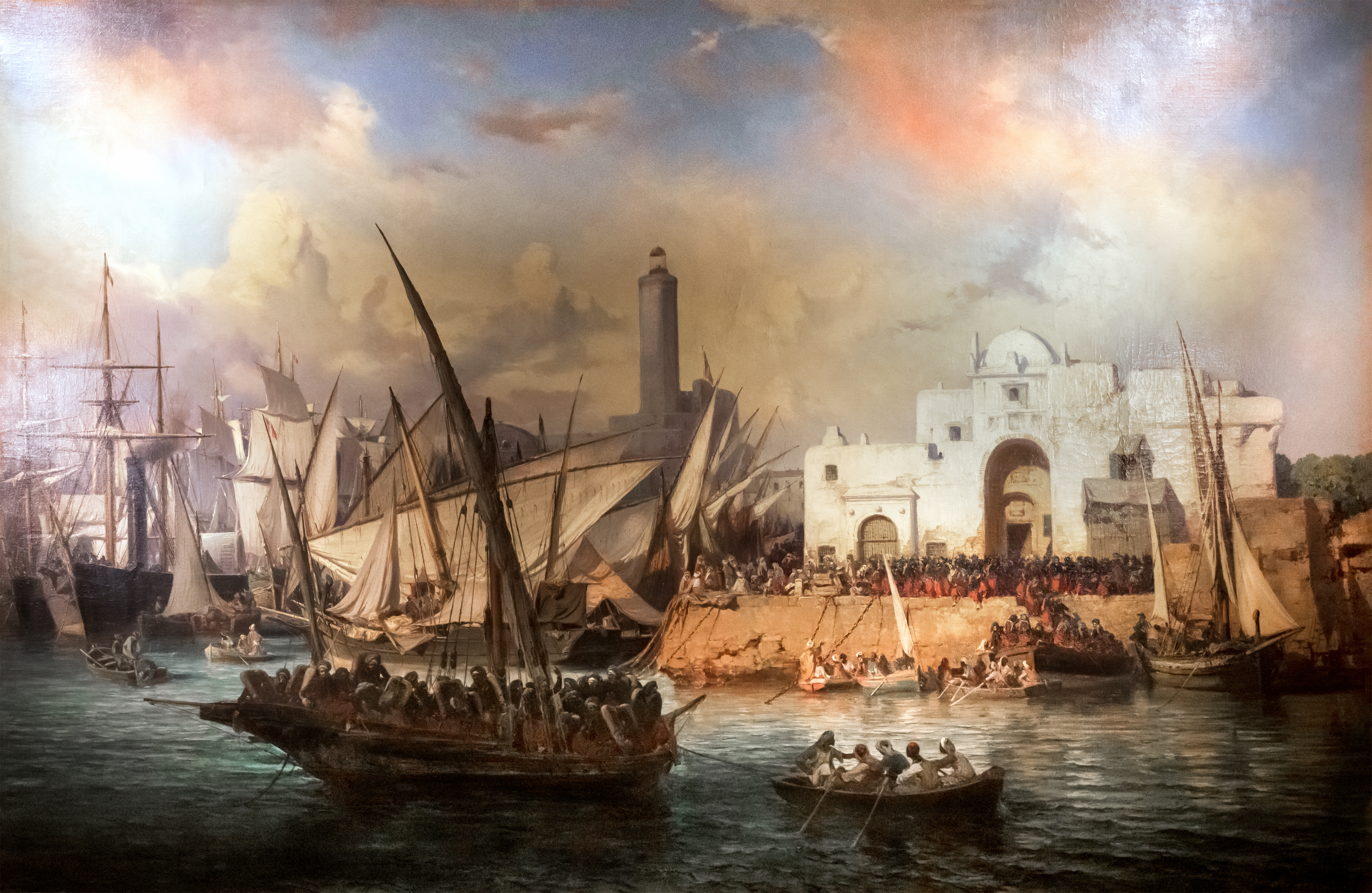
Boarding of the Zouaves leaving Algiers for Crimea by Vincent Courdouan

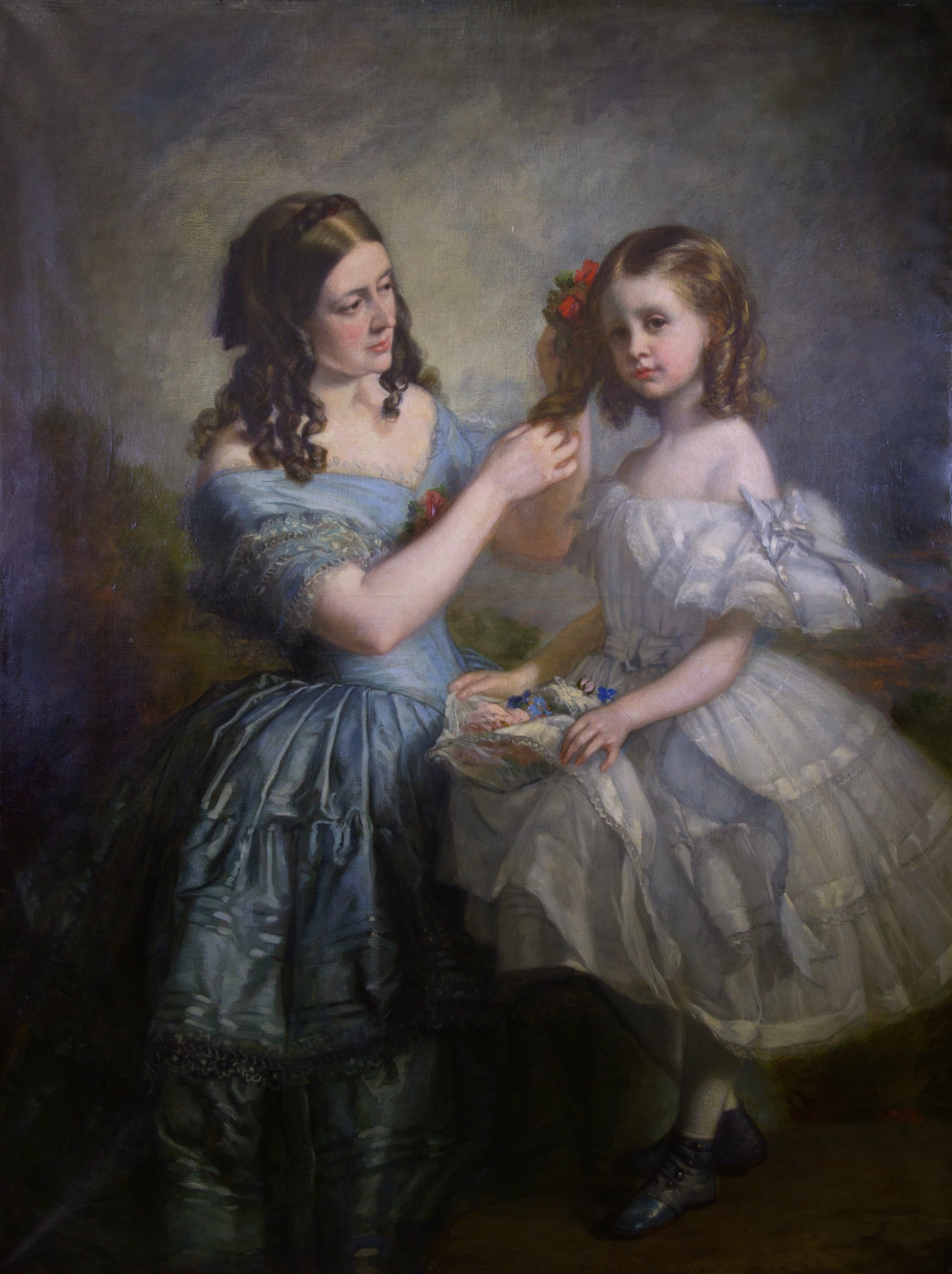
Portrait of Baronness de Pierres and her daughter Jeanne Marie by George Peter Alexander Healy

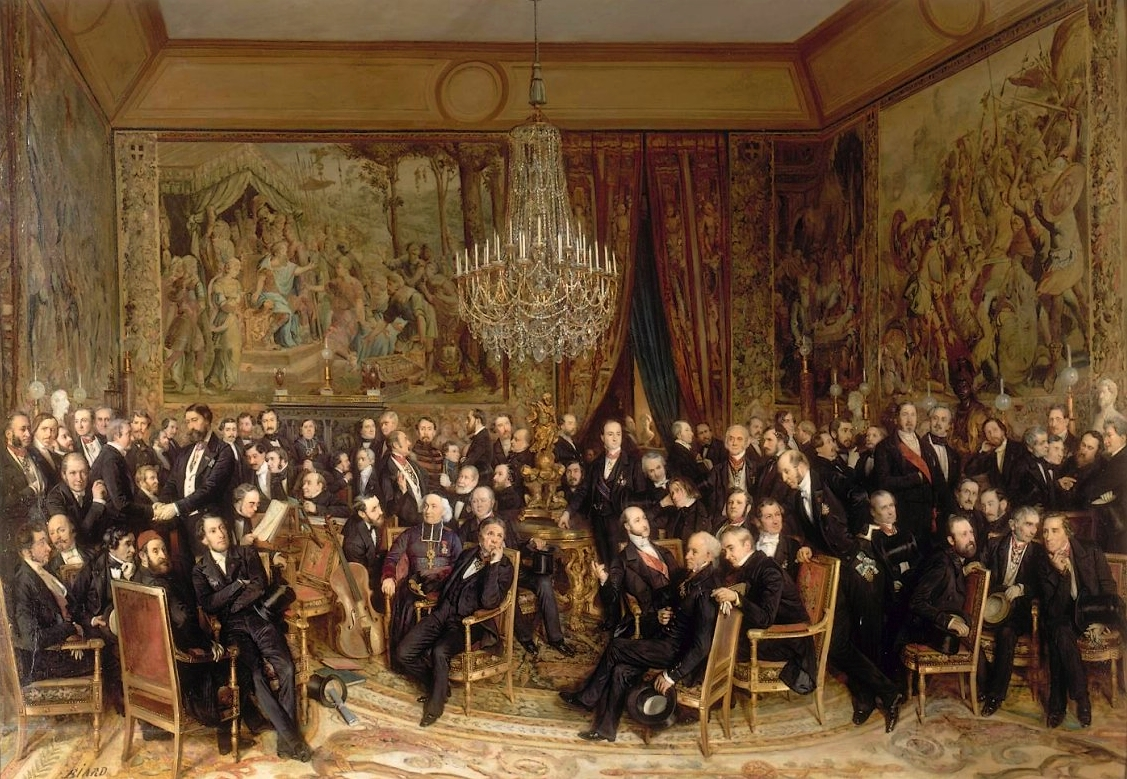
The Salon of Count of Nieuwerkerke by François-Auguste Biard

Diana Bathing by Jean-Baptiste-Camille Corot

The Two Foscari by Eugène Delacroix

Aristotle's Lay by Henri Lehmann

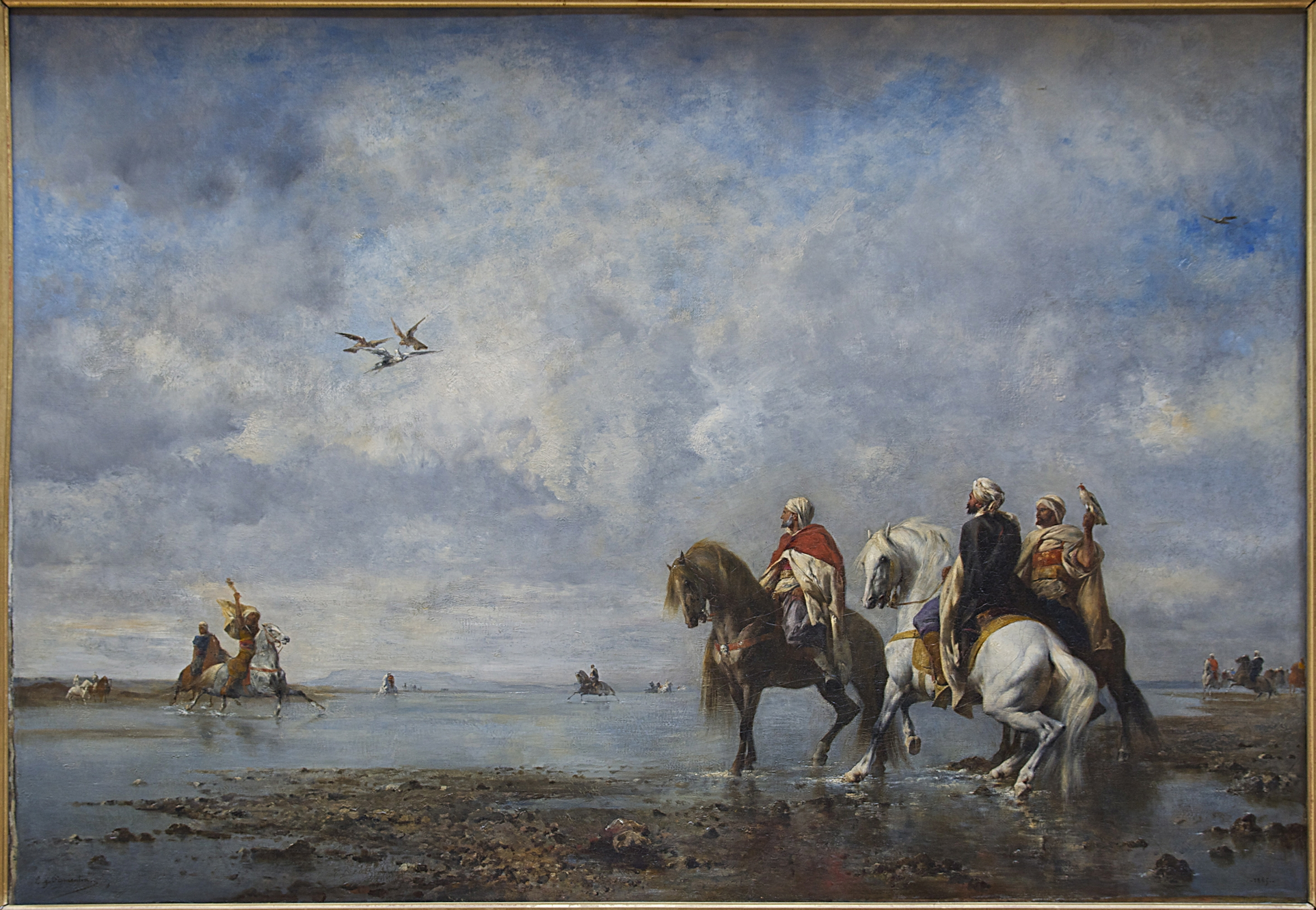
Hunting heron, Algeria by Eugène Fromentin

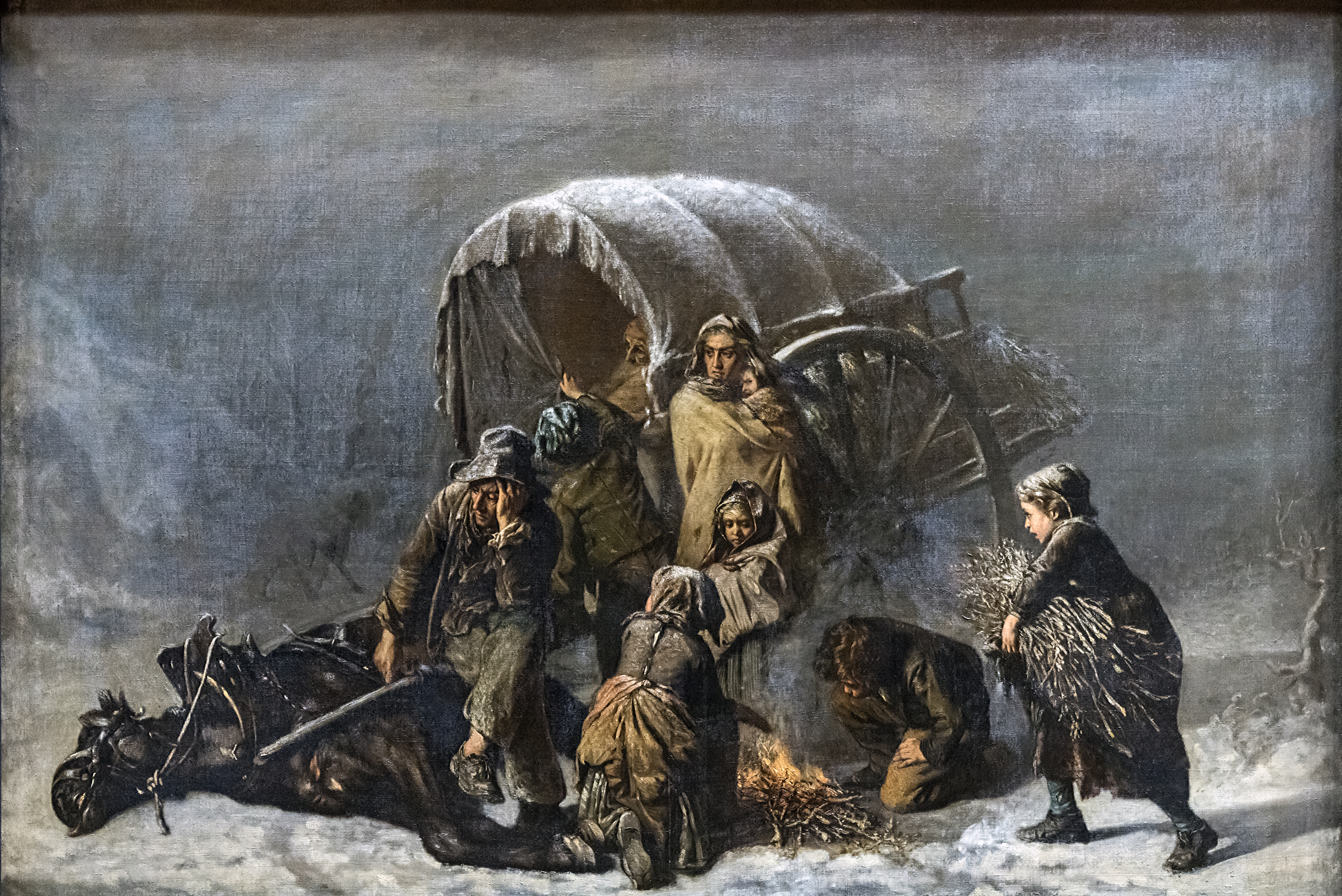
The Forced Stop by Alexandre Antigna

Béatrix by Joseph-Hugues Fabisch

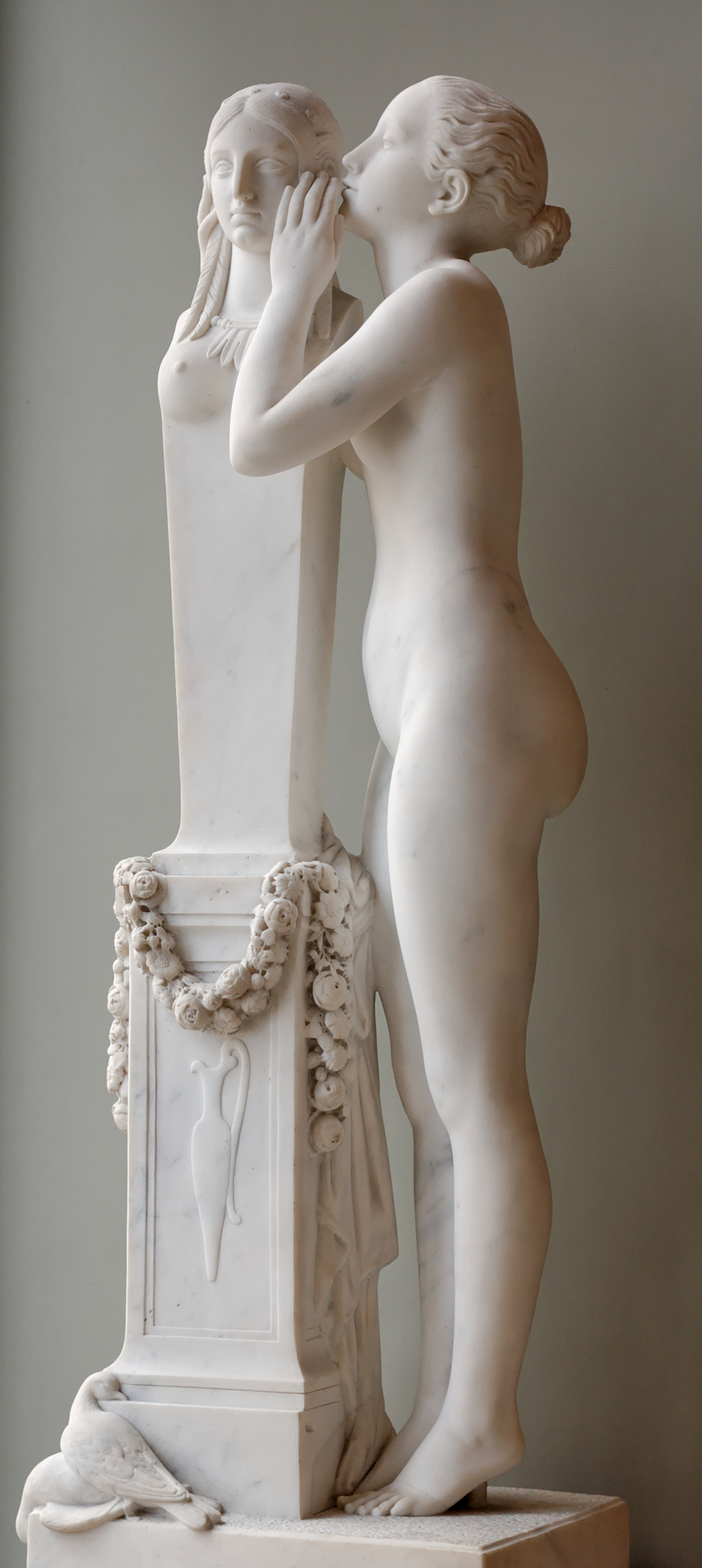
First Confidence to Venus by François Jouffroy

== See also ==
- Adrien Chenot
