= Triumphal Arc, Kamianets-Podilskyi =

Triumphal Arc
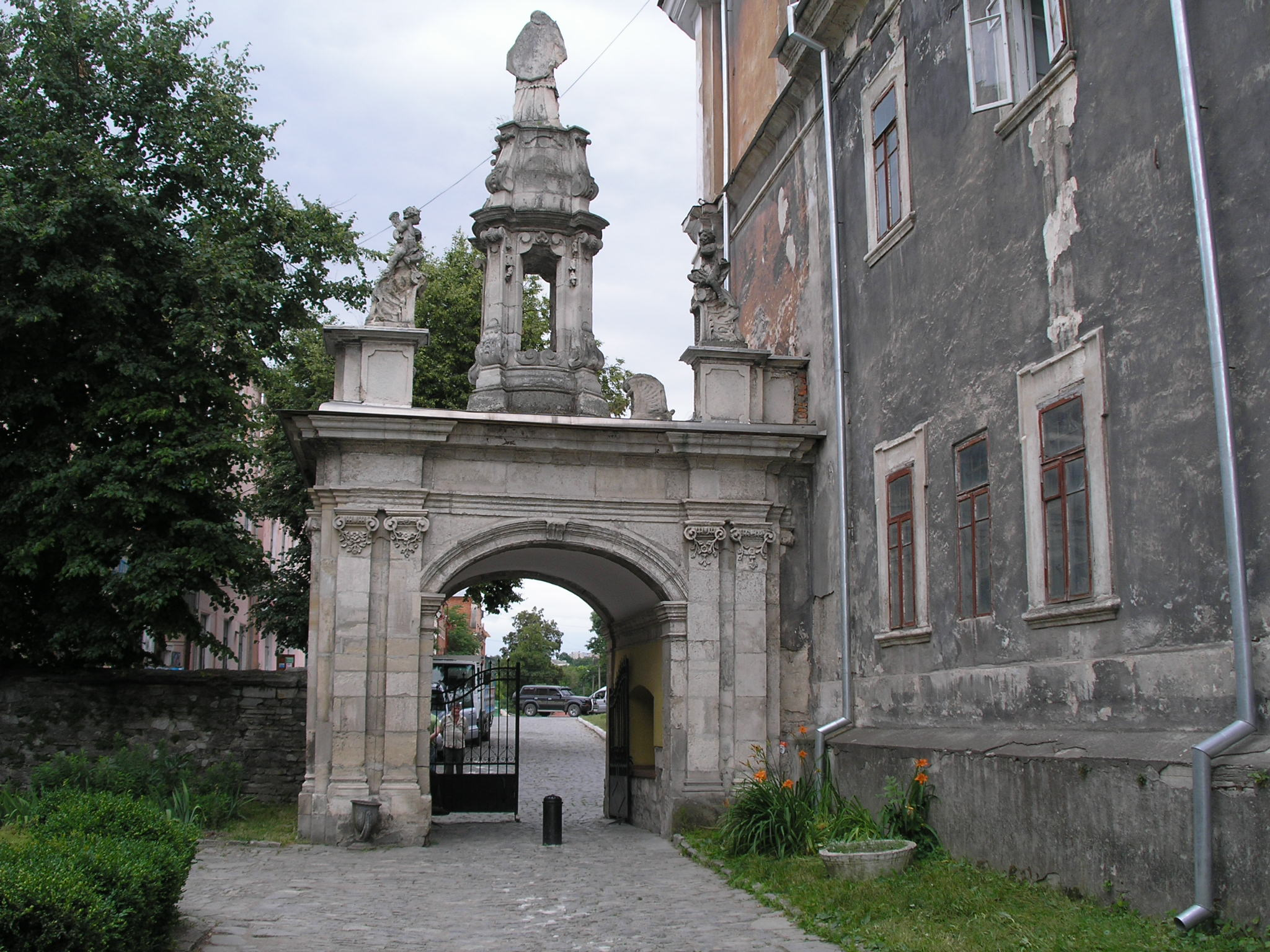
- The 18th century Baroque Triumphal Arc in Kamianets-Podilskyi
- Interactive map of Triumphal Arc
- Location: Kamianets-Podilskyi, Ukraine
- Built: 1781
- Built for: Stanisław August Poniatowski

Immovable Monument of National Significance of Ukraine
- Official name: Брама (Gateway)
- Type: Architecture
- Reference no.: 220132/3

The Triumphal Arc (Ukrainian: Тріумфальна арка) was built in 1781 for the visit of Polish King Stanisław August Poniatowski to the historic city of Kamianets-Podilskyi in Khmelnytskyi Oblast (province) of western Ukraine. The arc was designed in the late Baroque style by city masters, and has survived till this day without any reconstructions. Restorations, have, however been conducted on the arc, in 1947–1948 and during the mid-1980s.

The Triumphal Arc is covered in white stone, and leads visitors into the Ss. Peter and Paul Cathedral. Above the entrance, there is an inscription reading that King Stanisław Poniatowski walked through here on November 11, 1781. The arc's columns are of the Ionic order.
