= Fountain of Águas Ferreas =

Baroque fountain in Fraião, Braga, Portugal

Fountain of the Iron Waters
- Fountain of Águas Ferreas
- Artist: Carlos Amarante, Paulo Vidal
- Completion date: July 1773
- Medium: Granite Fountain
- Location: Braga, Portugal
- 41°32′30.33″N 8°23′57.19″W

The Fountain of the Iron Waters (Portuguese: Fonte das Águas Ferreas), is a Baroque fountain in the civil parish of Fraião, municipality of Braga. The fountain, with ornate backrest, is located in an L-shaped courtyard, with a zoomorphic spout, niche and contorted frame. The design integrates details approximating decorative elements used by André Soares, most notably the Municipal Hall and Church of the Congregados, highlighting the abilities of master-mason Paulo Vidal. However, this project was actually designed by Carlos Amarante, at the beginning of his career, having been appointed the inspector of public works in 1773.

== History ==
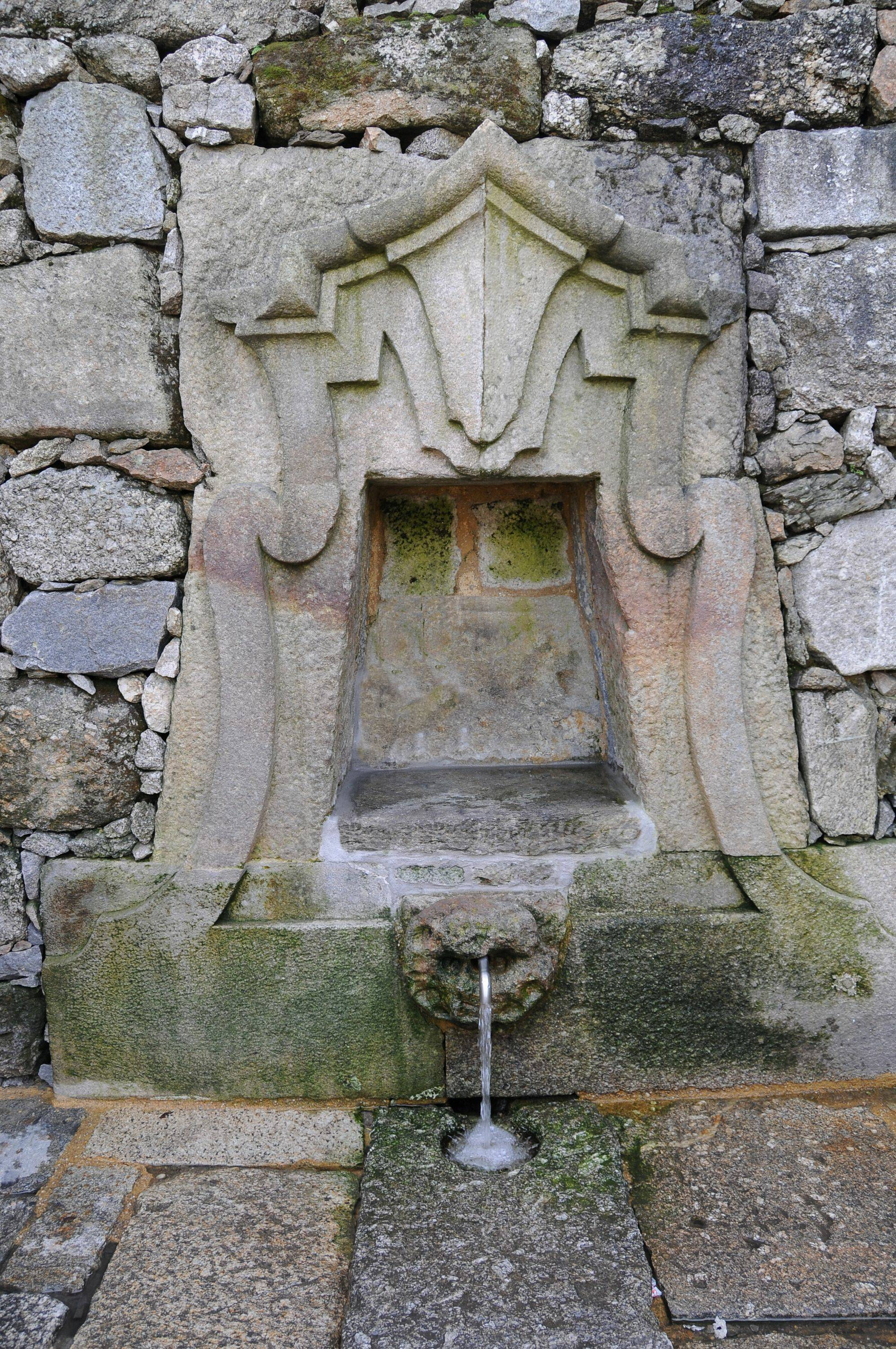
The ornate design of the "simple" fountain of Águas Ferreas in Fraião

In July 1773, as a sequence of events resulting from the discovery of the iron waters in the civil parish of Fraião, the archbishop (D. Gaspar de Bragança) ordered the municipal council to proceed with the use of the waters. On July 30, of the same year, the municipal government decided to construct "for the people with better hygiene, comfort and seclusion to serve from the said water", contracted master mason Paulo Vidal (a resident of Adaúfe) to construct the fountain for 80$000 réis. The waters became famous for its health-related properties, including chronic inflammations; the medicinal waters of Fraião were referenced in the book Bens da Fábrica da Igreja de Lamacães in 1775.

As a sequence of interest manifested by professor José Joaquim da Silva Pereira Caldas from the Liceu Sá de Miranda in 1851, a report was provided to the municipal council on the superior quality of the fountain's waters. Councilmen José Valério Capela suggested the examination of the waters, budgeting the analysis of the water, as well as the construction of a public road from the Largo do Espadanido to the fountain. A commission of inquiry visited the fountain on 21 July, determining the necessity that the fountain should be cleaned and repaired.

In 1977, a visit by members of the municipal council to the location, resulting in the cleaning of the fountain. At the same time, a number of articles were published in the newspapers, by the parish priest of Fraião, Father António Oliveira Gomes, noting its abandon. But, even then, there was a lack of interest; by 1979 was covered in brushwood and clay, hiding the fountain.

A new article was written in 1991, noting the proposal for the urbanization in the valley of Lamaçães. On 11 May 1994, there was a request to classify the fountain as a monument, elaborated by the Dom Diogo de Sousa Museum. Ironically, on September 10, the structure was completely destroyed in course of the construction of hypermarket Carrefour. As a consequence of this architectural error, in May 1997 the fountain was reconstructed in current the location by the local government authority (including a commemorative plaque and signalling) under the orientation of Alberto Lima, technician from the University of Minho. Alberto Lima revealed that during their hydrological studies, it became impossible to identify the subterranean circuit of the waters, due to the non-existence of water and the fact that the spring was subterranean.

== Architecture ==
The fountain is isolated in an urban context, behind the hypermarket Continente, encircled by garden and lawn, bordered by cedars, with stone and polished granite, alluding to a reconstruction of the structure at the location.

The source is inserted in a recessed enclosure, in a L-shaped layout, with slabs of irregular masonry of granite and accessed by an eight-step staircase along the south arm. This staircase leads to two bunks, flanked by the eastern wall of the courtyard.

The Águas Ferreas fountain has a simple decor, with the structure marked by broken and undulating forms of wealth in style. The fountain and backrest in stone, is embedded in the wall, and composed of a three-part trapezoidal niche frame. In the center is a zoomorphic spout, which is cut into the base frame, surmounted by a trimmed cornice, adorned by relief stave geometry.

An inscription is carved on the fountain access; without frame or decoration, and carved into stone: FONTE DE FRAIÃO 1773 RECONSTRUÍDA EM MAIO DE 1997 O PATRIMÓNIO É UM ESPELHO DO PASSADO (Fountain of Fraião 1773 Reconstructed in May 1997 The patrimony is a window on the past).
