= Alexis Barrault =

French engineer (1812–1865)

Alexis Barrault (1812–1865) was a French engineer who designed The Palais de l'Industrie (Palace of Industry), an exhibition hall located between the Seine River and the Champs-Élysées which was erected for the Paris World Fair in 1855.
