= Palais de l'Industrie =

Exhibition hall in Paris, France (1855–1897)

Coordinates: 48.8669°N 2.3142°E

Palace of Industry
- Palais de l'Industrie
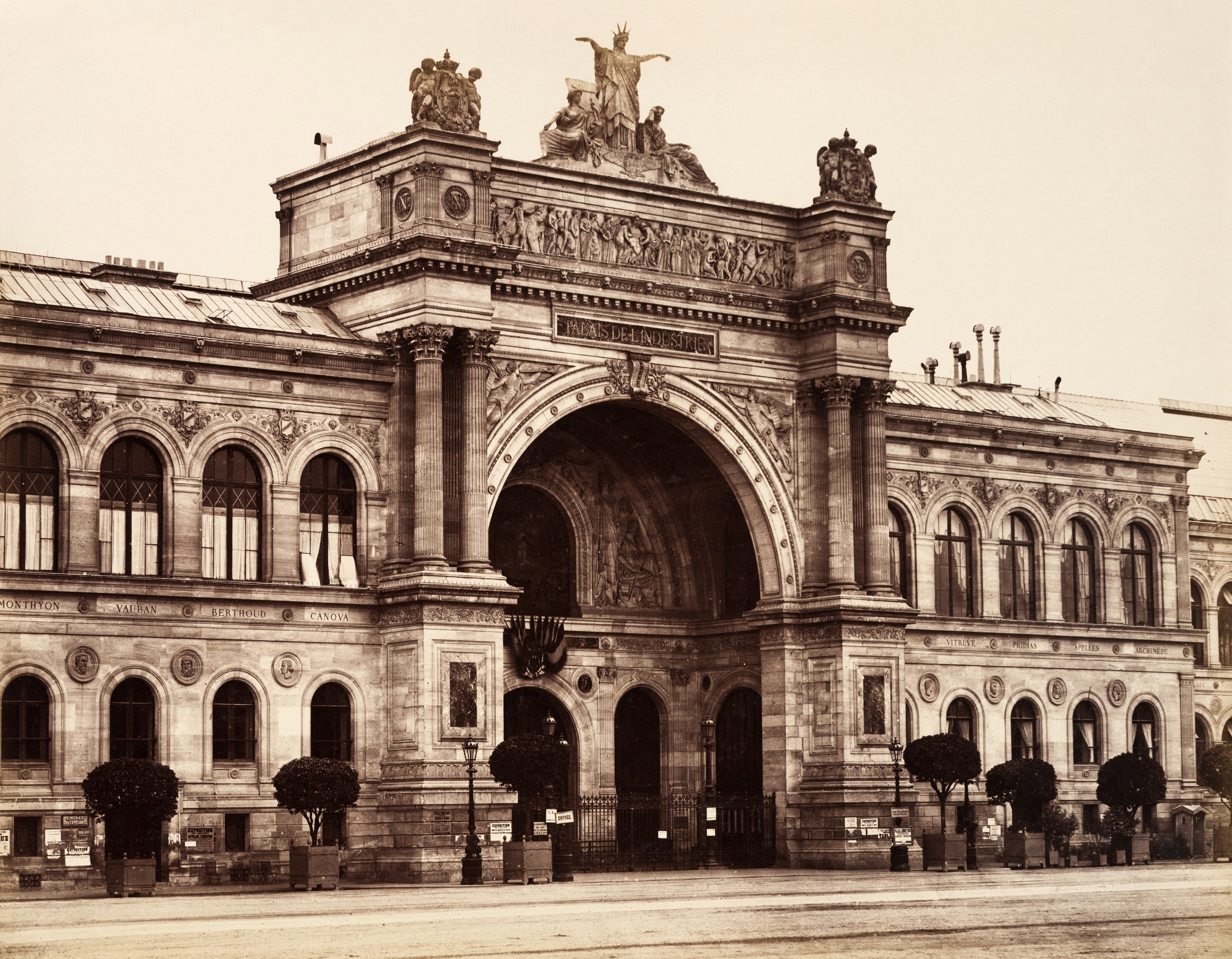
- Palais de l'Industrie, c. 1860 photograph by Édouard Baldus
- Interactive map of the Palace of Industry area

General information
- Architectural style: Neoclassical
- Location: Paris, France
- Year built: 1839
- Demolished: 1897

The Palais de l'Industrie (French pronunciation: [palɛ də lɛ̃dystʁi]; Palace of Industry) was an exhibition hall located in Paris between the Seine River and the Champs-Élysées, which was erected for the Paris World Fair in 1855. This was the last of several buildings with the same name erected on the same site. The first Palais de l'Industrie was built in 1839 and was replaced for subsequent exhibitions in 1844 and 1849. The 1855 building was mainly designed by the architect Jean-Marie-Victor Viel and the engineer Alexis Barrault. It was demolished in 1897 to make way for the Grand Palais of the World Fair in 1900.

Emperor Napoleon III wished the World's Fair of 1855, which followed London's Great Exhibition by four years, to prove the superiority of the French by surpassing the British fair in every way. In particular, he desired a spectacular exhibition hall to rival The Crystal Palace. A competition held in 1852 was won by a plan by architect Jean-Marie-Victor Viel and engineer Desjardin, which combined the traditional use of masonry with that of cast iron. Due to cost constraints, however, the plans had to be reworked, for which the engineer Alexis Barrault is credited. In the final design, masonry was used only for the exterior walls, which were to be one metre thick and eighteen metres high. However, these massive walls were barely able to support the weight of the projecting cornice, and had to be reinforced with cast iron columns and beams.

The Palace of Industry was 260 metres (850 feet) long and 105 metres (344 feet) wide. Its principal nave was 190 metres (620 feet) long, and 48 metres (157 feet) wide. It was surrounded on four sides by aisles two stories high, and 30 metres (98 feet) wide. Its semi-circular trusses bridged a 24-metre (79-foot) span to create an enormous exhibition room. Despite its immense size, the palace was not large enough to house all of the expected exhibitors, so that two temporary buildings were constructed to house the remaining displays. The main failure of the building, which was not completed by the day the World Fair opened, was its poor ventilation. Although this made the building extremely hot during the day, it served as a hall for numerous exhibits and social events until its demolition in 1897.

Octave Mirbeau, commenting on the Palais de l'Industrie as a focal point of the Champs Elysées, compared the building to "an ox trampling through a rose garden." Although critics nearly universally condemned the Gothic "heaviness" of the building, the sheathing of an iron and glass structure with a stone casing was imitated in the London Exposition of 1862 and the World Columbian Exposition in Chicago, and even in the buildings that were to replace it: the Grand Palais and Petit Palais built for the 1900 World Fair.

The entrance of the Palais de l'Industrie was crowned by Élias Robert's sculpture group France crowning Art and Industry.

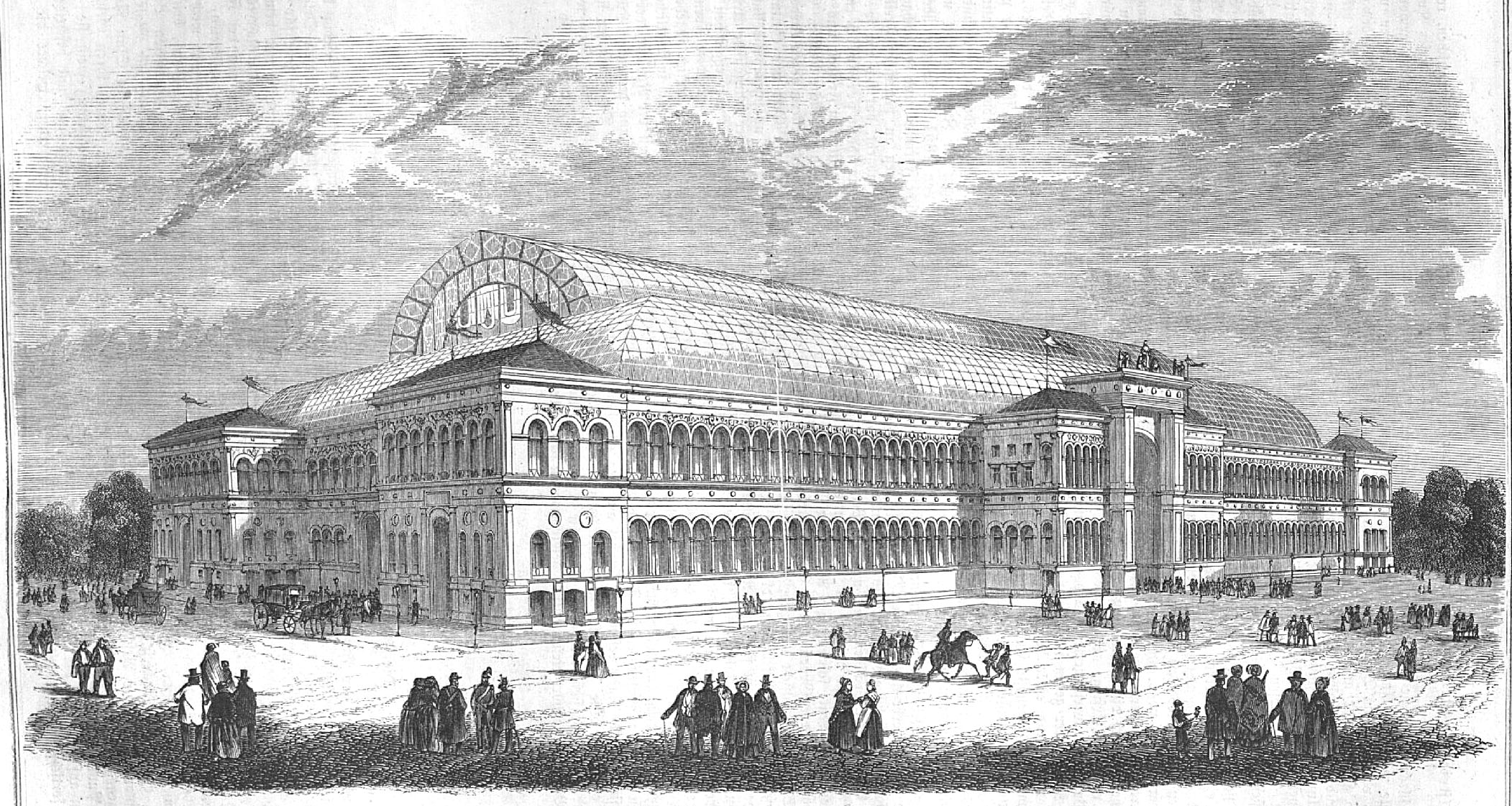
Perspective view (1855 engraving)

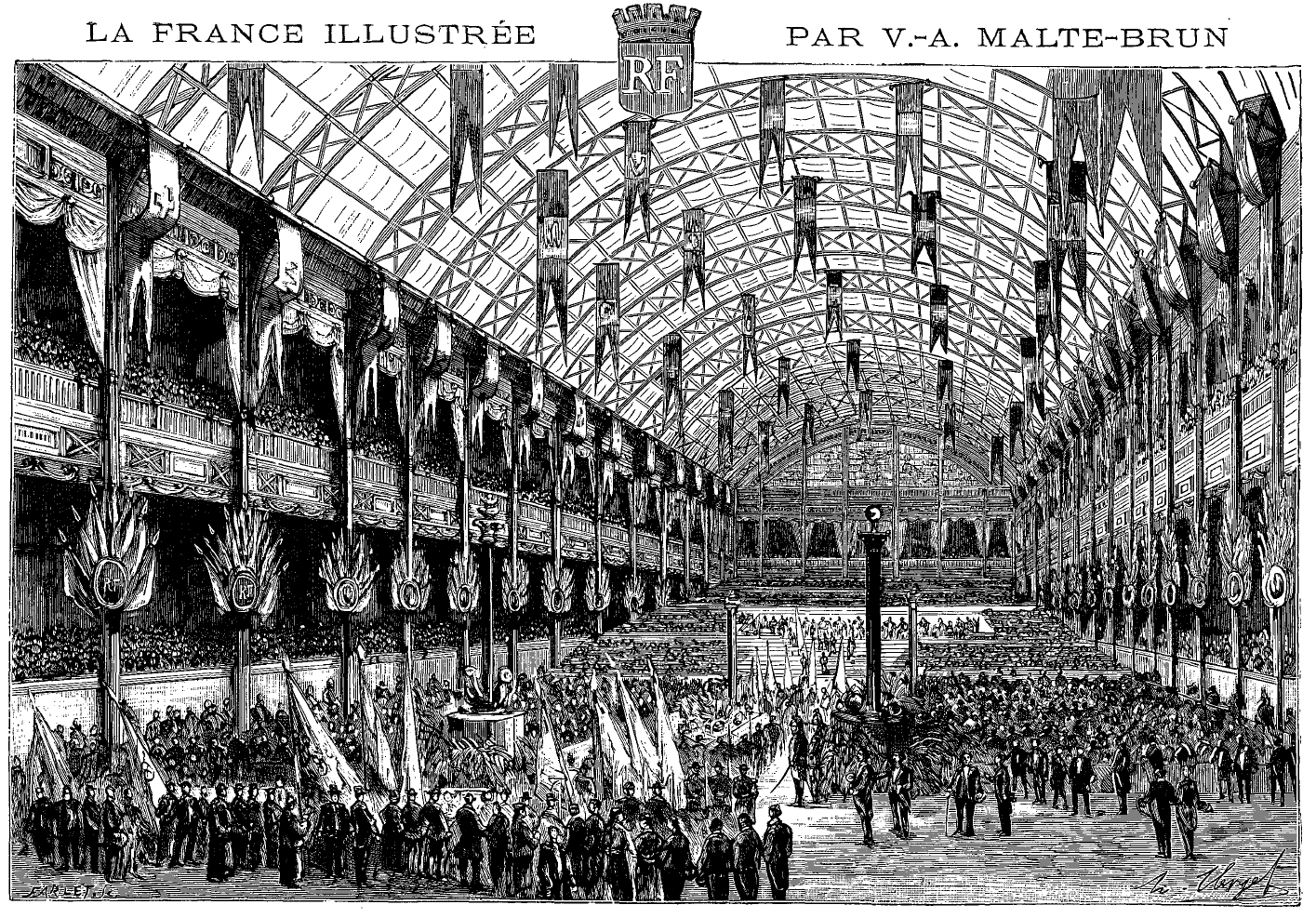
Main hall during the 1878 Exposition
