= Jean-Marie-Victor Viel =

French architect

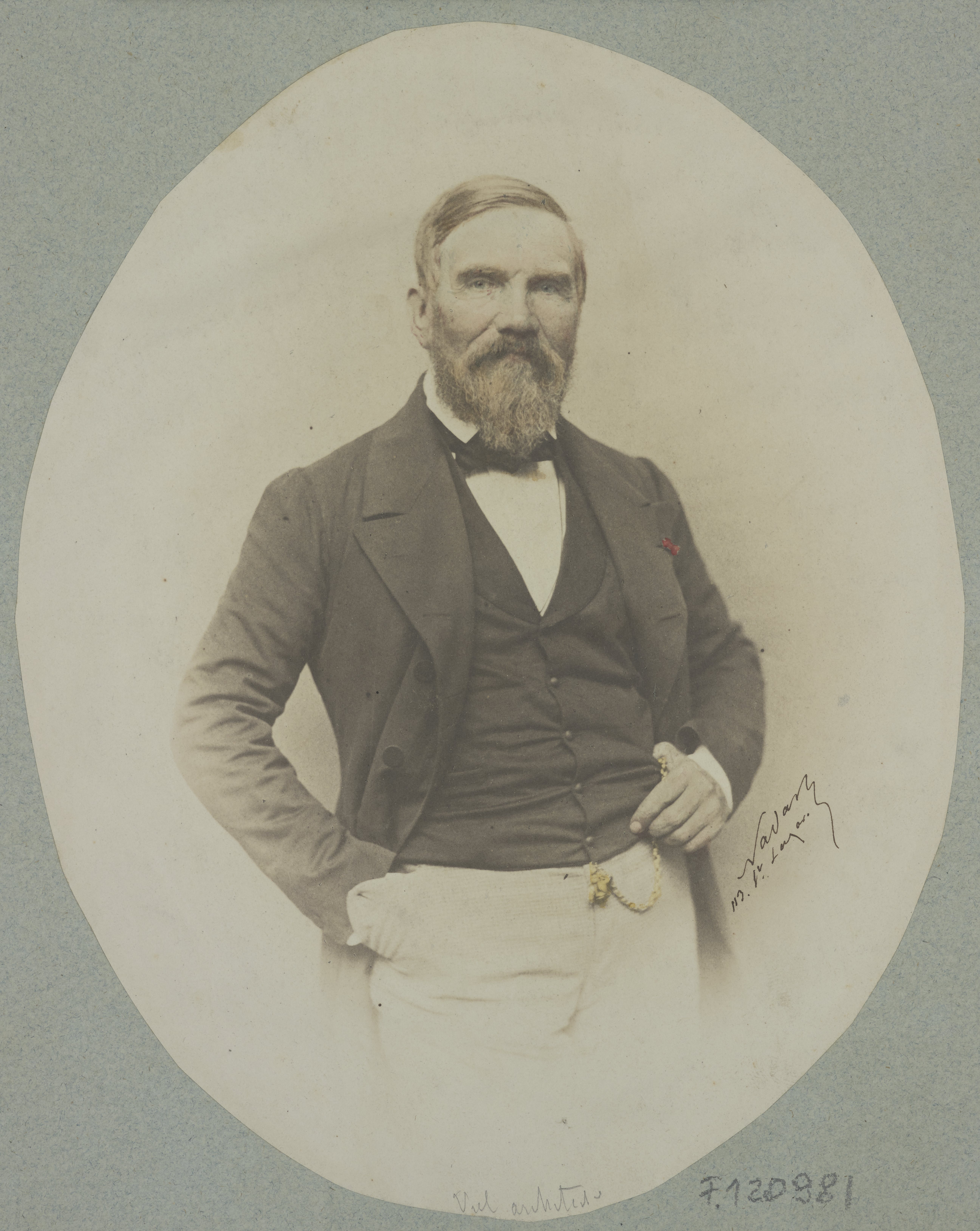
Viel c. 1859

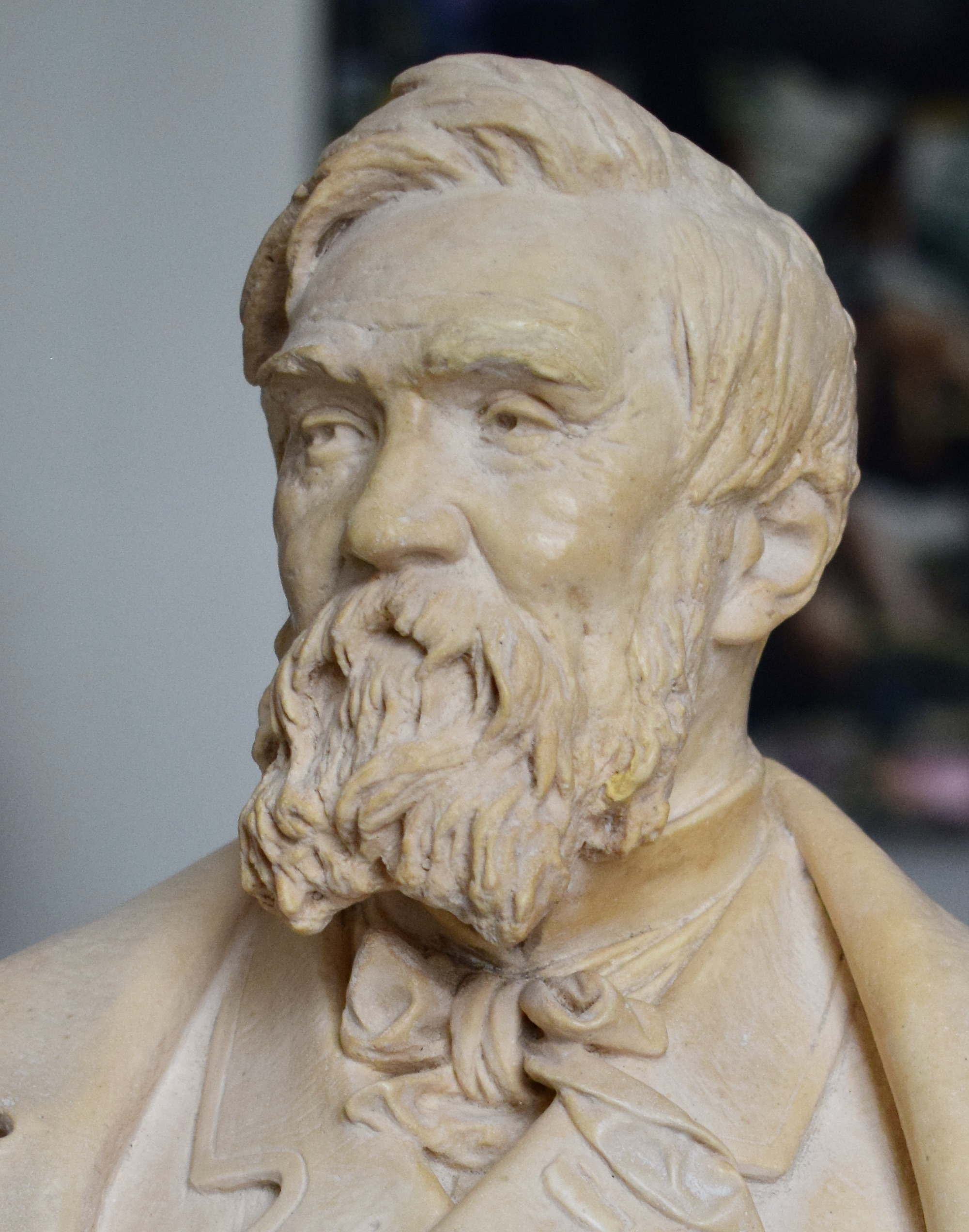
Bust of Viel by Albert-Ernest Carrier-Belleuse, 1863

Jean-Marie-Victor Viel (1796–1863) was a French architect who designed the Palais de l'Industrie, an exhibition hall located between the Seine River and the Champs-Élysées which was erected for the Paris World Fair in 1855.
