= St. Hilarius Parish Church of Näfels =

Coordinates: 47.1005°N 9.0640°E

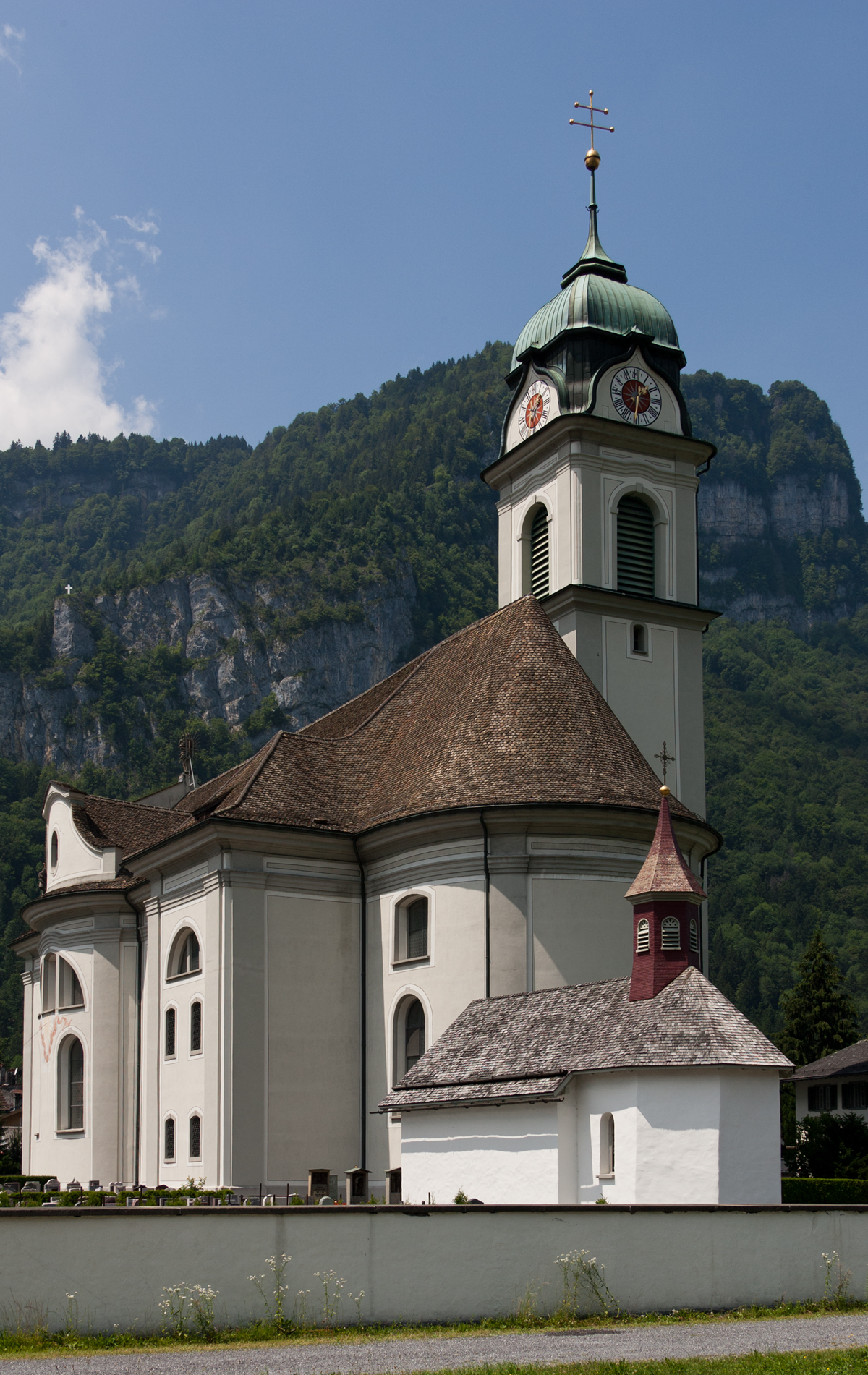

St. Hilarius Parish Church of Näfels (German: Pfarrkirche St. Hilarius) is a Catholic church in Näfels, Glarus Nord, Glarus Canton, Switzerland. It is listed as a Cultural Property of National Significance.

== History ==
The church is named for Hilary of Poitiers. Built in the Baroque style, it was designed by architects Johann Singer and Jakob Singer of Lucerne and built from 1779 to 1781. It was renovated in 1979, on the occasion of the two hundredth anniversary of the start of its original construction.

An eternal flame is kept burning at the church, in atonement for a 14th-century murder. Exactly what murder is a matter of some confusion: it may be the 1357 murder of Heinrich Stucki by his neighbour Konrad Mueller, or another in which two brothers named Tschudi quarreled and one killed the other. In any case, someone deeded walnut oil from trees on two parcels of his land to be supplied to keep the flame burning. Later the deed was changed to make this into a payment of CHF70 per year, a condition which was attached to the land title in the local registry. Legally speaking, this condition was lost in 1911 during registry reforms, but owners of the land continued to pay it over the course of the next century, until 2012 when the new landowner refused the obligation and the church took him to court to dispute his non-payment.

== See also ==
- List of cultural property of national significance in Switzerland: Glarus
