= Château de Saint-Cloud =

Former royal palace in France, today a national park

Coordinates: 48°50′15″N 2°12′53″E

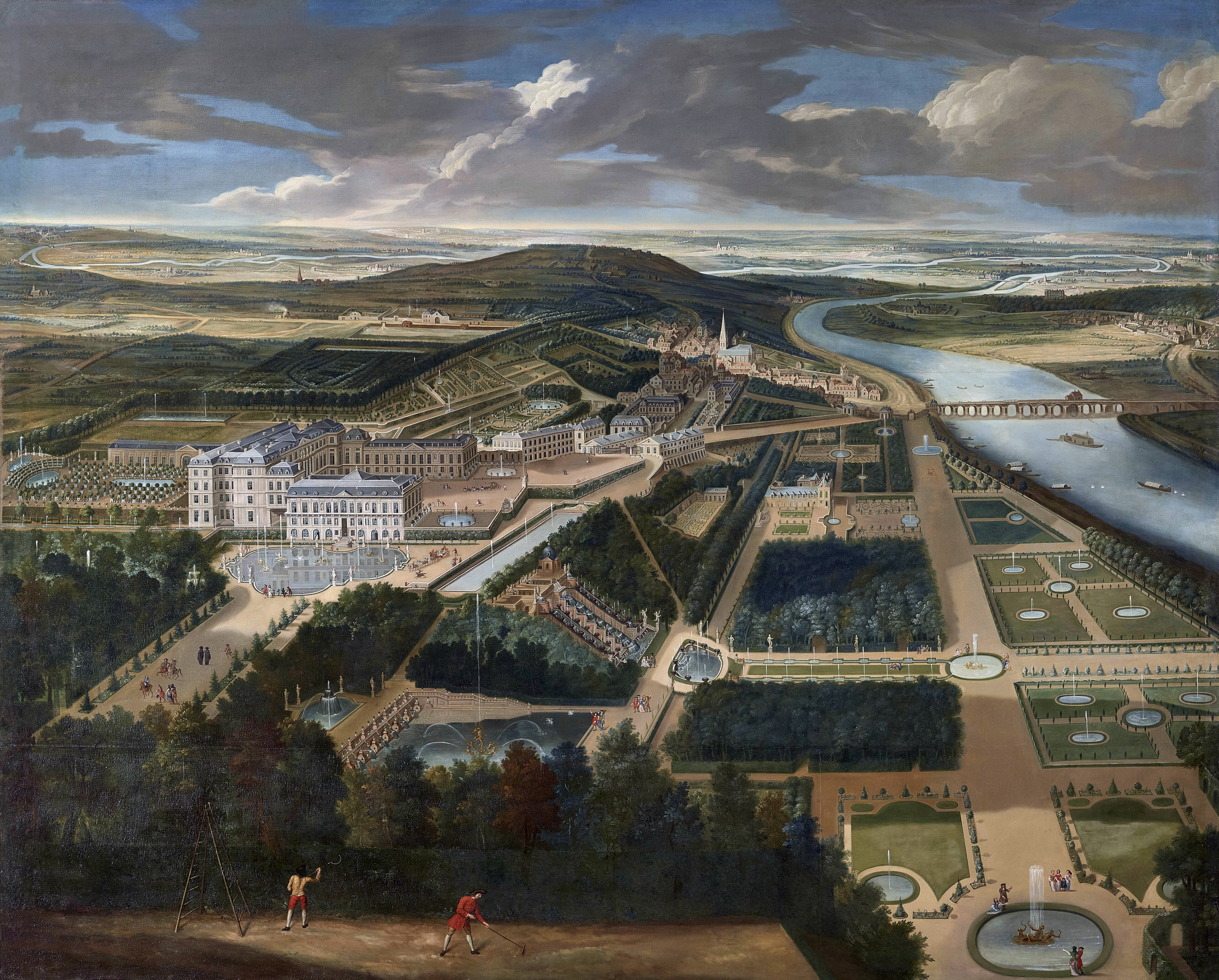
- The château and gardens, c. 1720

- Location within Paris

General information
- Type: Château
- Architectural style: French Baroque, Neo-Classical
- Construction started: c. 1570
- Completed: c. 1701
- Destroyed: 1870
- Demolished: 1891
- Client: Philippe I, Duke of Orléans; Marie Antoinette

Design and construction
- Architects: Antoine Le Pautre; Jean Girard; Jules Hardouin Mansart; Richard Mique

The château de Saint-Cloud (French pronunciation: [ʃato d(ə) sɛ̃ klu]) was a château in France, built on a site overlooking the Seine at Saint-Cloud in Hauts-de-Seine, about 5 kilometres (3 miles) west of Paris. The gardens survive, and the estate is now known as the parc de Saint-Cloud.

The château was expanded by Philippe I, Duke of Orléans, in the 17th century and by Marie-Antoinette, Queen of France and Navarre, in the 1780s. In the 19th century it was used by Napoleon Bonaparte, the royal family during the Bourbon Restoration, Louis-Philippe d'Orléans, and Napoleon III. The palace burned down in 1870 during the Franco-Prussian War, and its ruins were demolished in 1891.

== History ==
=== Hôtel d'Aulnay ===
The hôtel (a sort of mansion) d'Aulnay on the site was expanded into a château in the 16th century by the Gondi banking family. The Gondis stemmed from a family of Florentine bankers established at Lyon in the first years of the 16th century, who had arrived at the court of France in 1543 in the train of Catherine de' Medici. In the 1570s, the Queen offered Jérôme de Gondi a dwelling at Saint-Cloud, the hôtel d'Aulnay, which became the nucleus of the château with a right-angled wing that looked out on a terrace.

The main front faced south, with a wing that terminated in a pavilion affording a handsome view over the Seine river. Henry III of France installed himself in this house in order to conduct the siege of Paris during the Wars of Religion. In 1589, he was assassinated there by the monk Jacques Clément.

=== 17th century ===
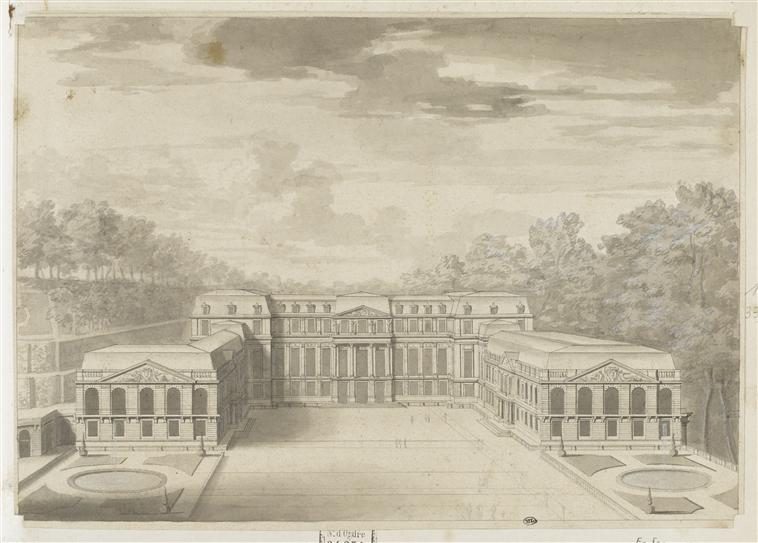
View of a design for Saint-Cloud

After the death of Jérôme de Gondi in 1604, his son Jean-Baptiste II de Gondi sold the château to Jean de Bueil, Count of Sancerre, who died shortly afterward. The château was bought back by Jean-François de Gondi, Archbishop of Paris. His embellishments notably included gardens by Tommaso Francini.

After the death of Jean-François de Gondi in 1654, the château was inherited by Philippe-Emmanuel de Gondi and then by his nephew Henri de Gondi, known as the Duke of Retz. The latter sold the property in 1655 to Barthélemy Hervart, a banker of German extraction who was intendant then surintendant des finances. He enlarged the park to 12 hectares and did considerable rebuilding. He built a grande cascade (not the present one) in the park.

Garden details that seem to be of this phase of Saint-Cloud were drawn by Israel Silvestre. It was built in the Italian style, with a concealed flat roof and frescoed façades. Its gardens descended in a series of terraces to the Seine, with fountains at each level.

On 8 October 1658, Hervart organised a sumptuous feast at Saint-Cloud in honour of the young Louis XIV, his brother, Philippe I, Duke of Orléans (Monsieur), their mother Anne of Austria, and Cardinal Mazarin. On 25 October, Monsieur bought the château and its grounds for 240,000 livres.

It appears that Mazarin pressed the sale, contributing to a policy of building a network of royal châteaux to the west of Paris and relieving the excessively enriched Hervart from the fate of Nicolas Fouquet, whose fête at Vaux-le-Vicomte precipitated his fall and imprisonment.

Monsieur was engaged in building operations at Saint-Cloud until his death in 1701. The works were designed and constructed by his architect Antoine Lepautre, who built the wings in 1677. The château as it was reconstructed for Monsieur took the form of a 'U' open to the east, towards the Seine, with the Gondi château, which had faced south, integrated into its left wing. To the rear, a long orangery formed a wing that prolonged the right wing of the courtyard. The entrance avenue, bordered by dependencies (some of which survive), arrived on an angle from the bridge.

Inside, the apartment of 'Madame', Princess Henrietta of England, located in the left wing, was decorated by Jean Nocret in 1660, and the 45-metre galerie d'Apollon, which occupied the whole of the right wing, was decorated with myths of Apollo by Pierre Mignard. It was finished in 1680.

The last child of Monsieur and Madame was born here in 1669 and named Anne Marie d'Orléans. She was the maternal grandmother of Louis XV.

The château was the site of the death of Princess Henrietta in 1670, for whose funeral Jacques-Bénigne Bossuet composed the oration.

The Grotto at Saint-Cloud, by Israël Silvestre

In October 1677, five days of magnificent feasts in Louis XIV's honour inaugurated the new decorations and demonstrated the splendour of Monsieur's ménage. The galerie was preceded and followed by a salon at either end, a measure to be taken up at Versailles, where Louis XIV found himself outdone in the matter of magnificent galleries, both by his brother and by his mistress in the château de Clagny. In 1678, he set out to build the Hall of Mirrors of the Palace of Versailles.

Following Lepautre's death in 1679, the work was continued by his executive assistant Jean Girard, a master mason rather than a full-fledged architect, and perhaps by Thomas Gobert. Jules Hardouin-Mansart intervened towards the end of the century, designing a grand staircase in the left wing in the manner of the Ambassadors' Staircase at Versailles (destroyed in 1752).

André Le Nôtre replanned the gardens and the park took on the dimensions it retains today. The Grande Cascade, constructed by Lepautre in 1664–65, has survived. Hardouin-Mansart added the basin and the lowermost canal in 1698.

A total of 156,000 livres is estimated to have been spent over the years.

=== 18th century ===
Saint-Cloud descended in the family of Monsieur's heirs, the Dukes of Orléans, and remained in their hands for most of the 18th century.

After protracted negotiations, the château de Saint-Cloud was bought in 1785 by Marie-Antoinette, who believed that the air there would be good for her children and was fond of the idea of leaving them a private and serene residence. Louis Philippe I, Duke of Orléans, who had not visited the château since his morganatic marriage with Madame de Montesson, was induced to part with it for 6,000,000 livres.

After the sale of the palace was officially finished, Marie-Antoinette set about transforming her new private home, which was intended, from 1790 to 1800, to house the court while the Palace of Versailles was renovated. She began to transform Saint-Cloud in 1787–88 with her preferred architect Richard Mique, who enlarged the corps de logis and the adjacent half of the right wing; he rebuilt the garden front. Hardouin-Mansart's staircase was demolished in favour of new stone stairs leading into the state apartments.

The château was at first furnished with pieces from the Garde-Meuble de la Couronne that had been collected from other royal residences, but soon furniture was commissioned for Saint-Cloud, showcasing the Queen's tastes and patronage of the arts; gilded chairs and marquetry commodes with gilt-bronze mounts in the Louis XVI style were being delivered to Saint-Cloud right up to the opening days of the French Revolution. In 1790, the royal family, imprisoned in the Tuileries Palace in Paris since 6 October 1789, managed to spend the summer here; those were their last days of privacy and freedom. During their stay, Saint-Cloud was the setting for the famous interview between Marie-Antoinette and Mirabeau.

After the monarchy was abolished, the château was declared a bien national and emptied of its furnishings, which were sold off, along with those of the other royal residences, in the Revolutionary sales.

The Saint-Cloud orangery was the setting for the Coup of 18 Brumaire (10 November 1799), in which the Directory was suppressed and the Consulate declared. Napoleon Bonaparte was proclaimed Emperor of the French on 18 May 1804 at the château, which was later used by his family as their main seat along with the Tuileries Palace.

=== 19th century ===
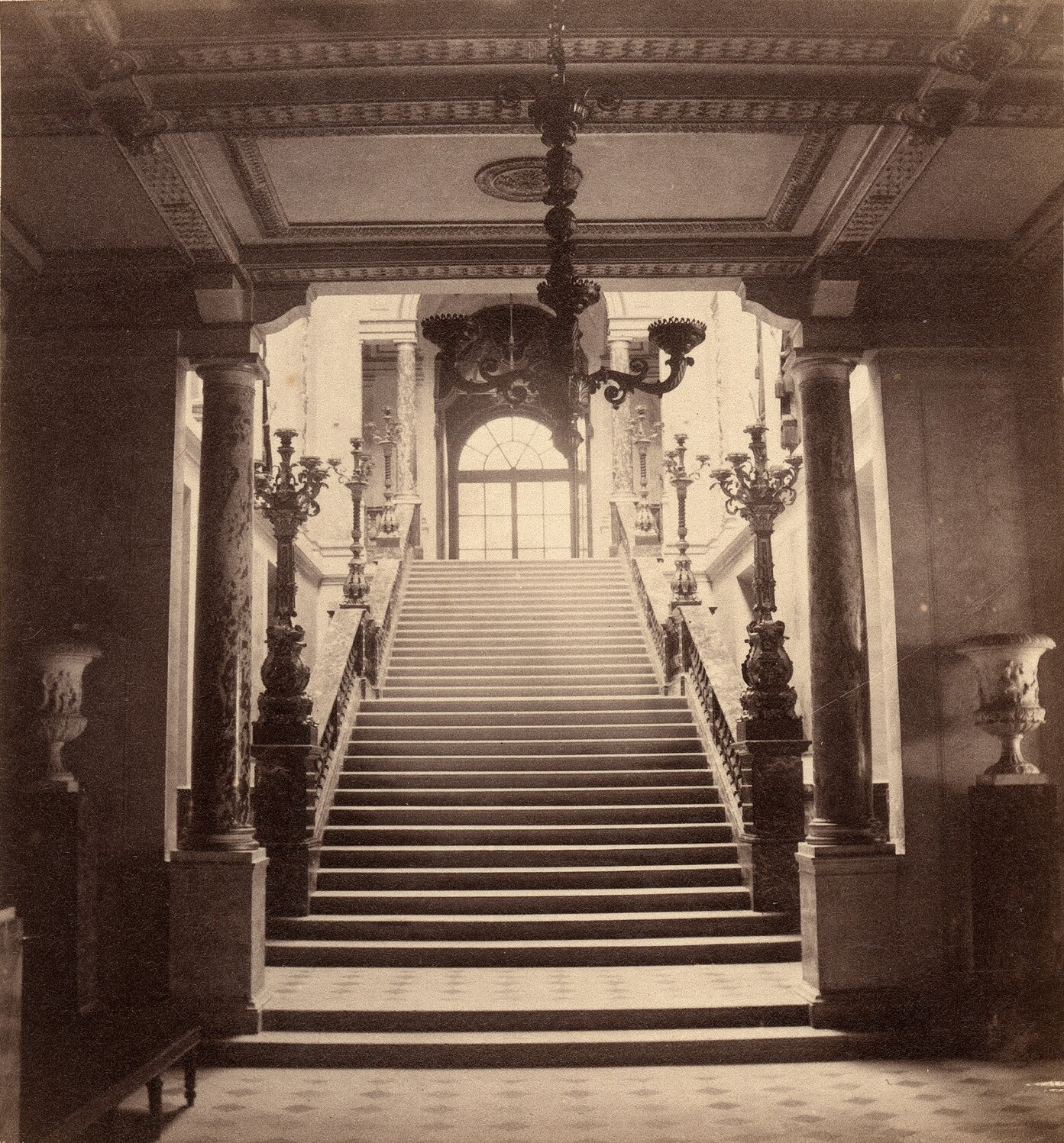
Escalier d'honneur

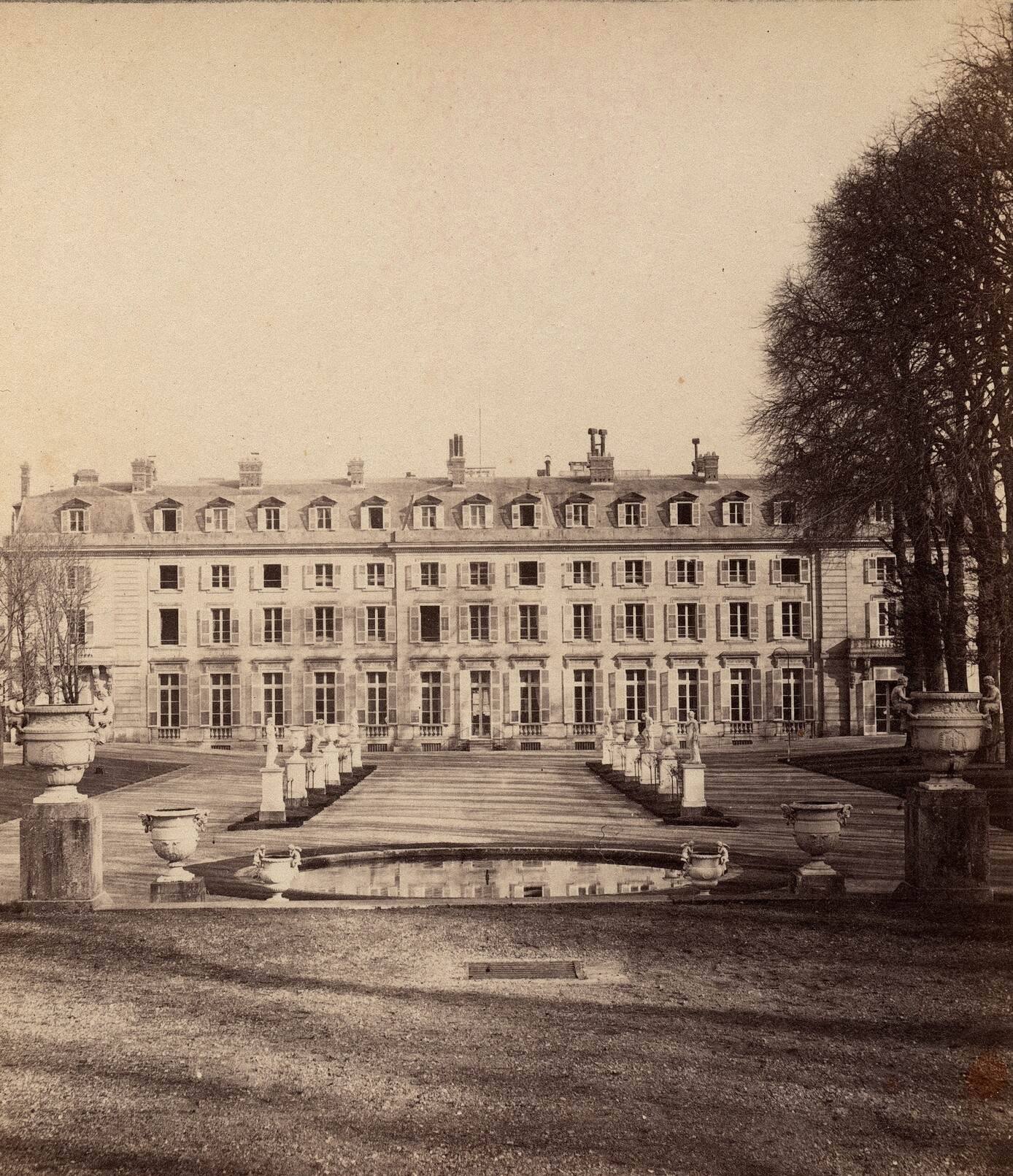
Garden Façade

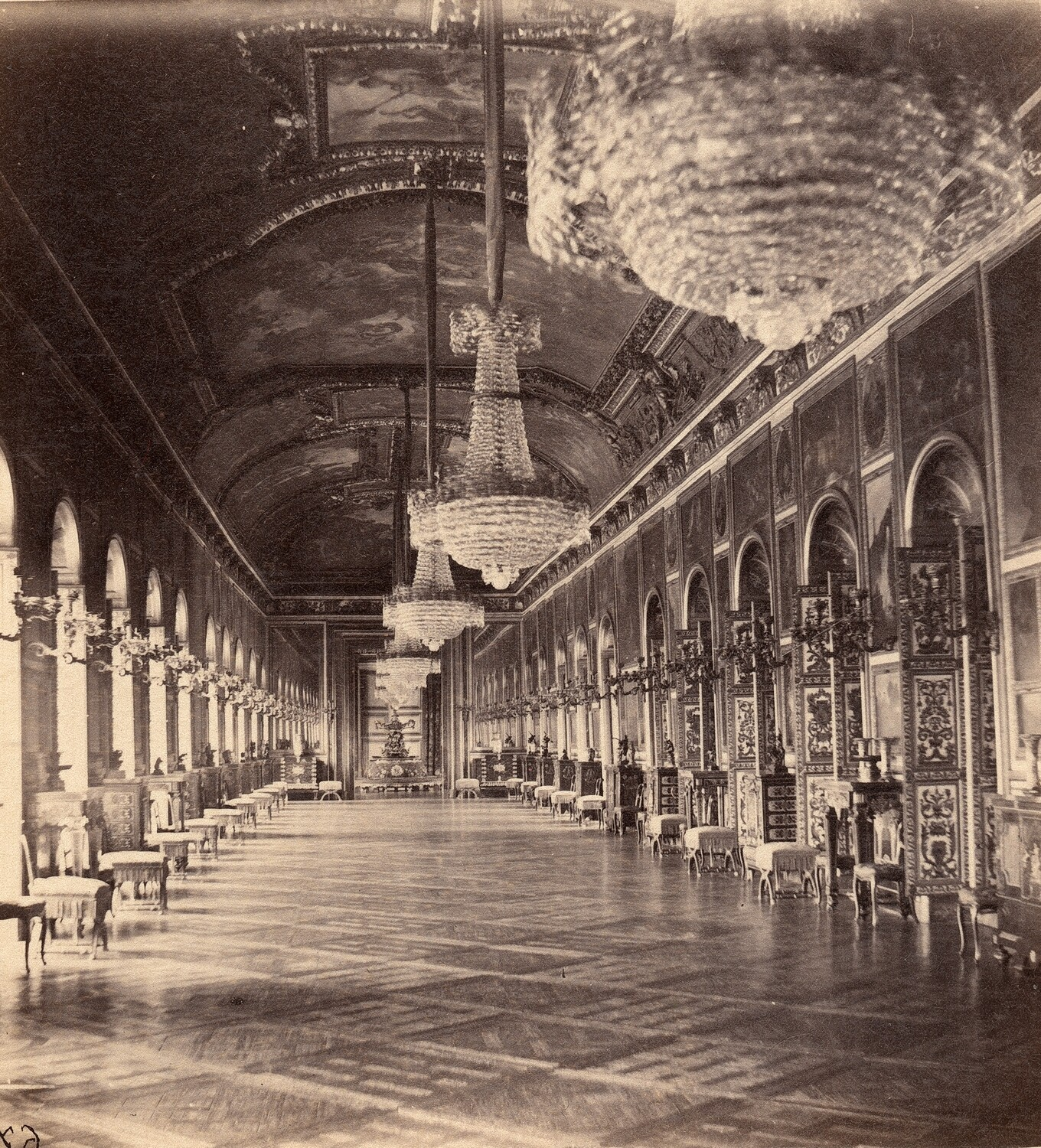
Galerie d'Apollon

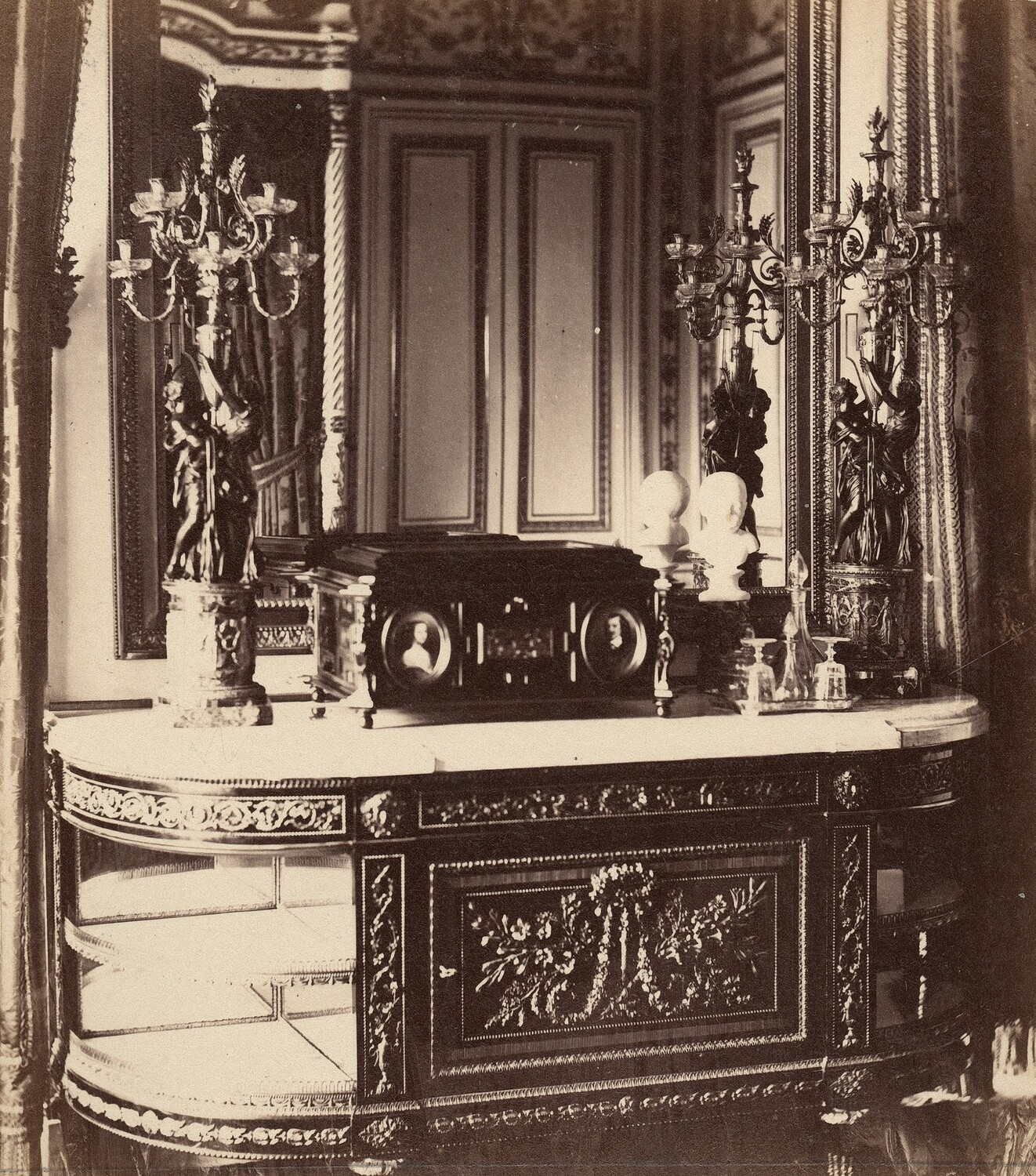
Eugénie's Bedroom

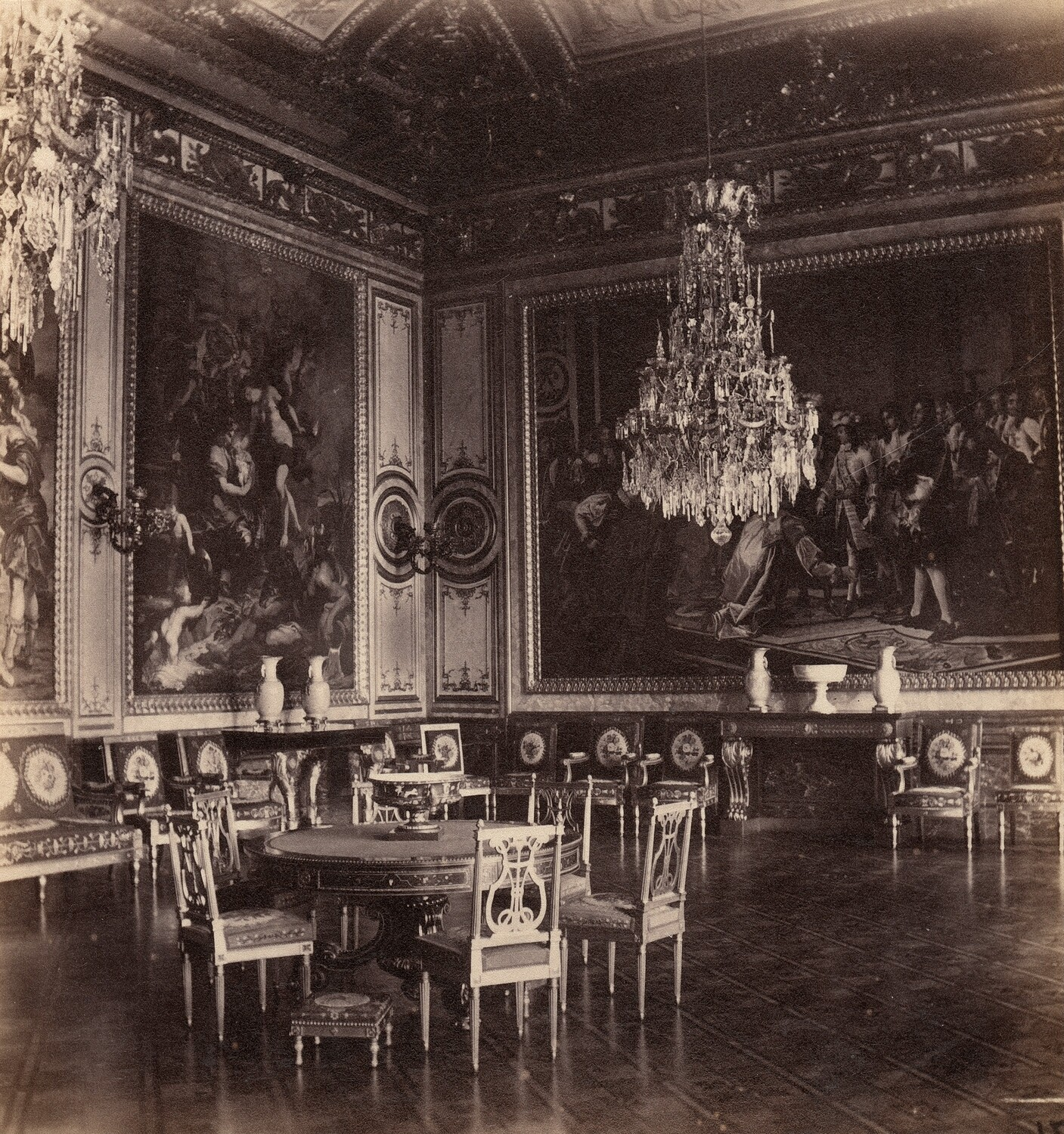
Salon de Vénus

Napoleon made Saint-Cloud his preferred residence and transformed the Salon de Vénus into a throne room, which Saint-Cloud had naturally lacked, but neither he nor the occupants to follow did much more to Saint-Cloud than interior decoration. When the Prussians captured it in 1814, they supposedly found Albrecht Altdorfer's The Battle of Alexander at Issus hanging in his bathroom.

It was at Saint-Cloud once again, in Monsieur's galerie d'Apollon, that Napoleon III invested himself as Emperor of the French on 1 December 1852. During the Second Empire, Napoleon III and his wife Eugénie stayed at Saint-Cloud in the spring and the autumn. Napoleon III had the orangery demolished in 1862 and Eugénie transformed the bedroom of Madame into a salon in the Louis XVI style. The castle was used during much of the 19th century to welcome members of European royal families; for example, Queen Victoria and Prince Albert stayed at Saint-Cloud when they came to visit Paris for the first Exposition Universelle of 1855.

At Saint-Cloud, Napoleon III declared war on Prussia on 28 July 1870, which turned out to be fatal. The heights dominating Paris were occupied by the Prussians during the Siege of Paris, who shelled Paris from the grounds of the château. Counter-fire from the French hit the building, specifically in Napoleon III's bedroom, and it caught fire and burned out on 13 October 1870. Much of its contents had been removed by Eugénie after the declaration of war.

The Third Republic ordered the demolition of the standing, roofless walls in 1891. The pediment of the château's right wing, one of the preserved parts of the building, was bought by Ferdinand I of Bulgaria and integrated into his Euxinograd palace on the Black Sea coast.

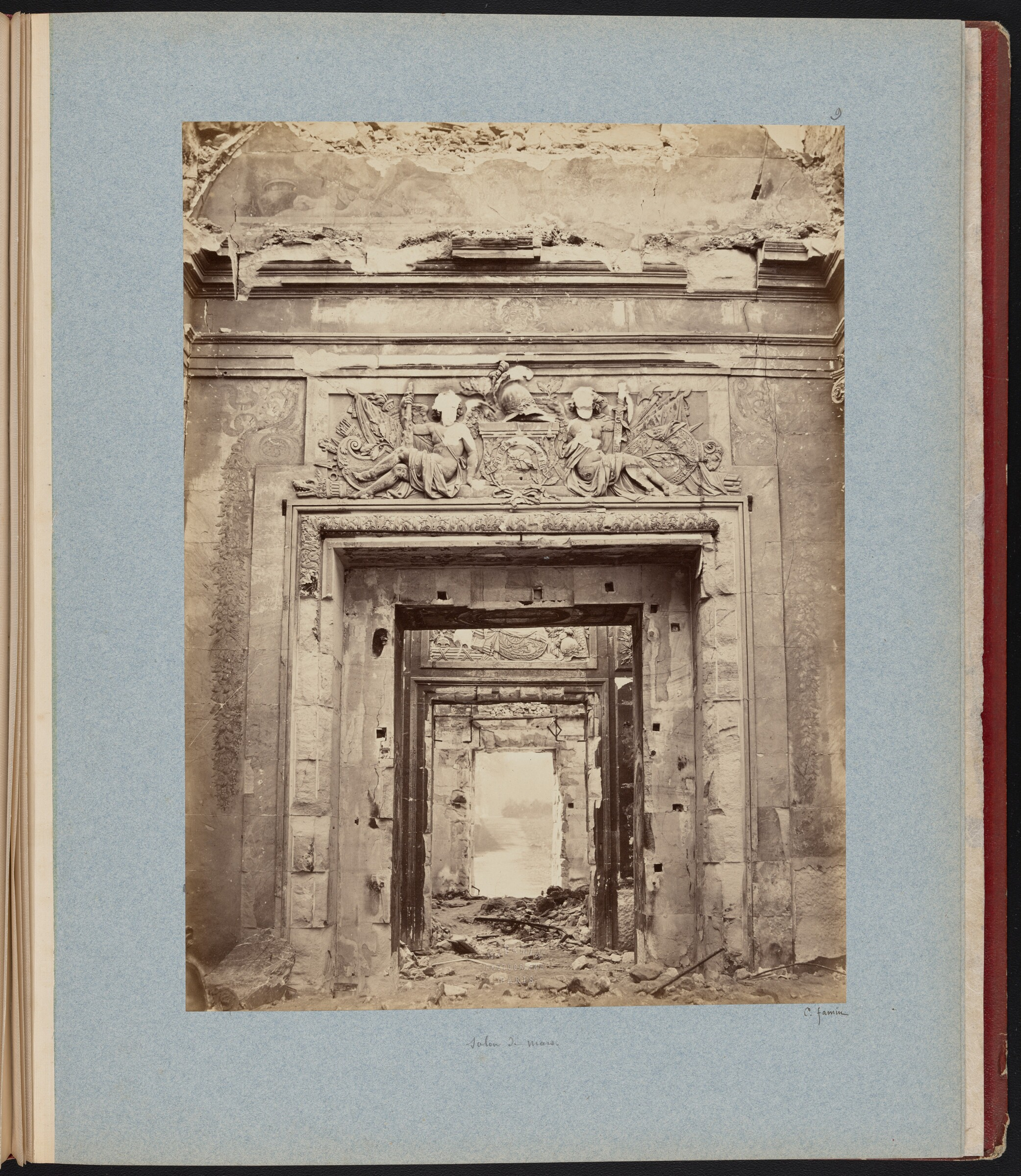
Interior view of the palace, by Constant Famin, 1870–1871

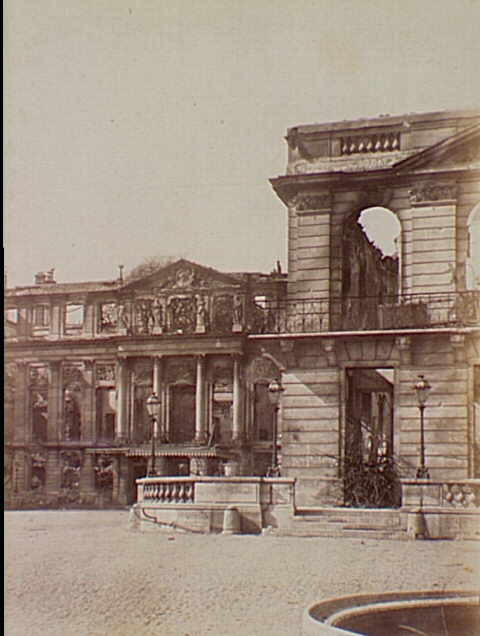
The burnt-out shell in 1870

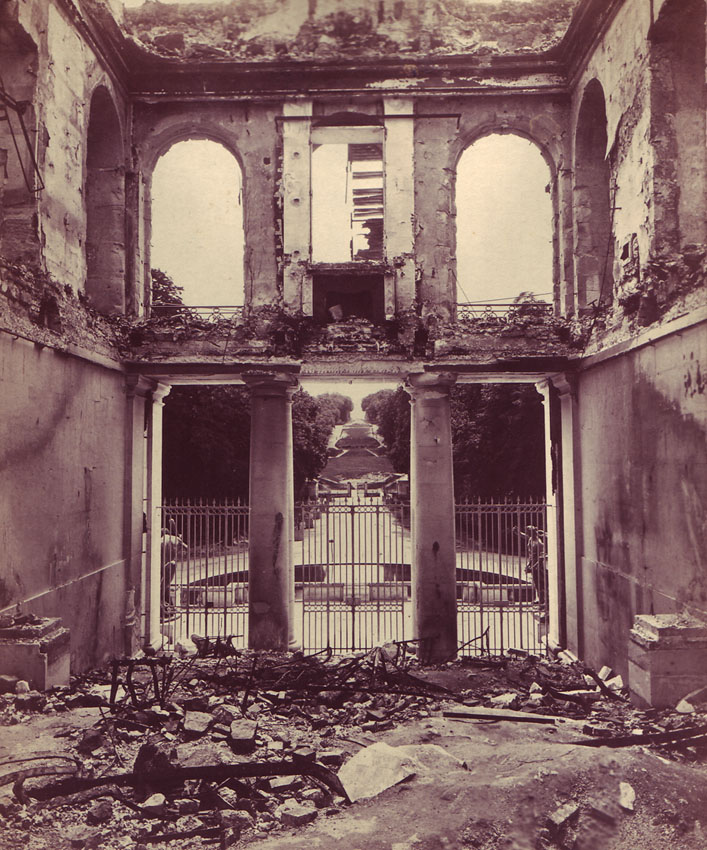
The ruins in 1871

=== 20th century ===
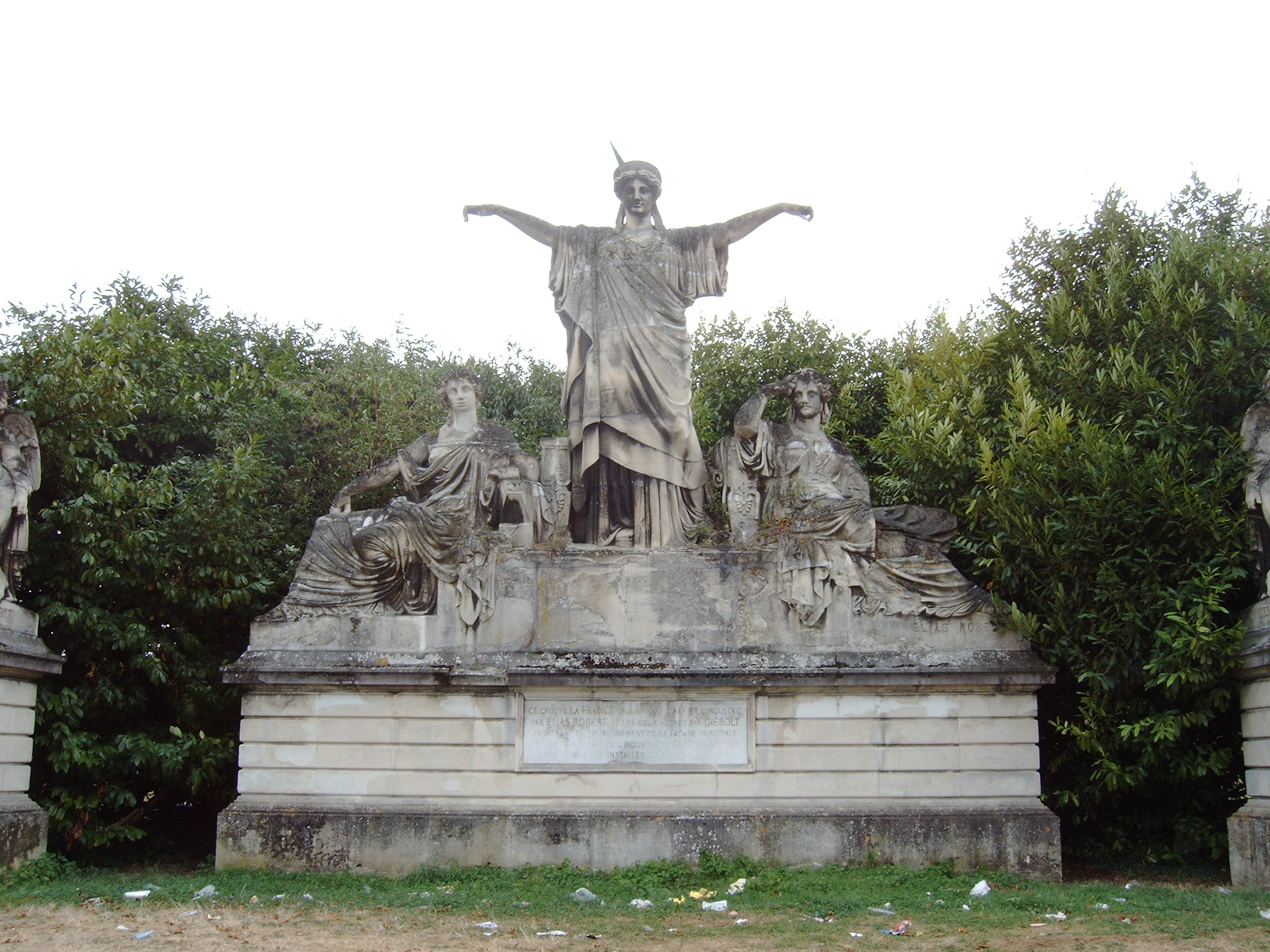
France crowning Art and Industry, by Élias Robert

The sculpture group France Crowning Art and Industry was installed in the lower part of the park in 1900.

Many thousands of trees in the park were knocked down or badly damaged in a storm on 26 December 1999, but restoration work was carried out.

=== 21st century ===
Today, only a few outbuildings and its park of 460 hectares remain, constituting the domaine national de Saint-Cloud. It includes the garden à la française designed by Le Nôtre, Marie-Antoinette's flower garden (where roses for the French state are grown), a garden à l'anglaise from the 1820s (the Trocadéro garden), ten fountains, and a viewpoint of Paris known as 'la lanterne', because a lantern was lit there when Napoleon Bonaparte was in residence.

The pavillon de Breteuil in the park has been the home of the General Conference on Weights and Measures since 1875.

The park has been the venue for the Rock en Seine festival since 2003.

=== Rebuilding the château de Saint-Cloud ===
Since December 2006, there has been a movement to reconstruct the château, led chiefly by an association that wants to finance the project primarily through private sources rather than through the government. The association, 'Reconstruisons Saint-Cloud!', was created in 2006 and seeks to fund the rebuilding by imposing a fee on visitors.

== See also ==
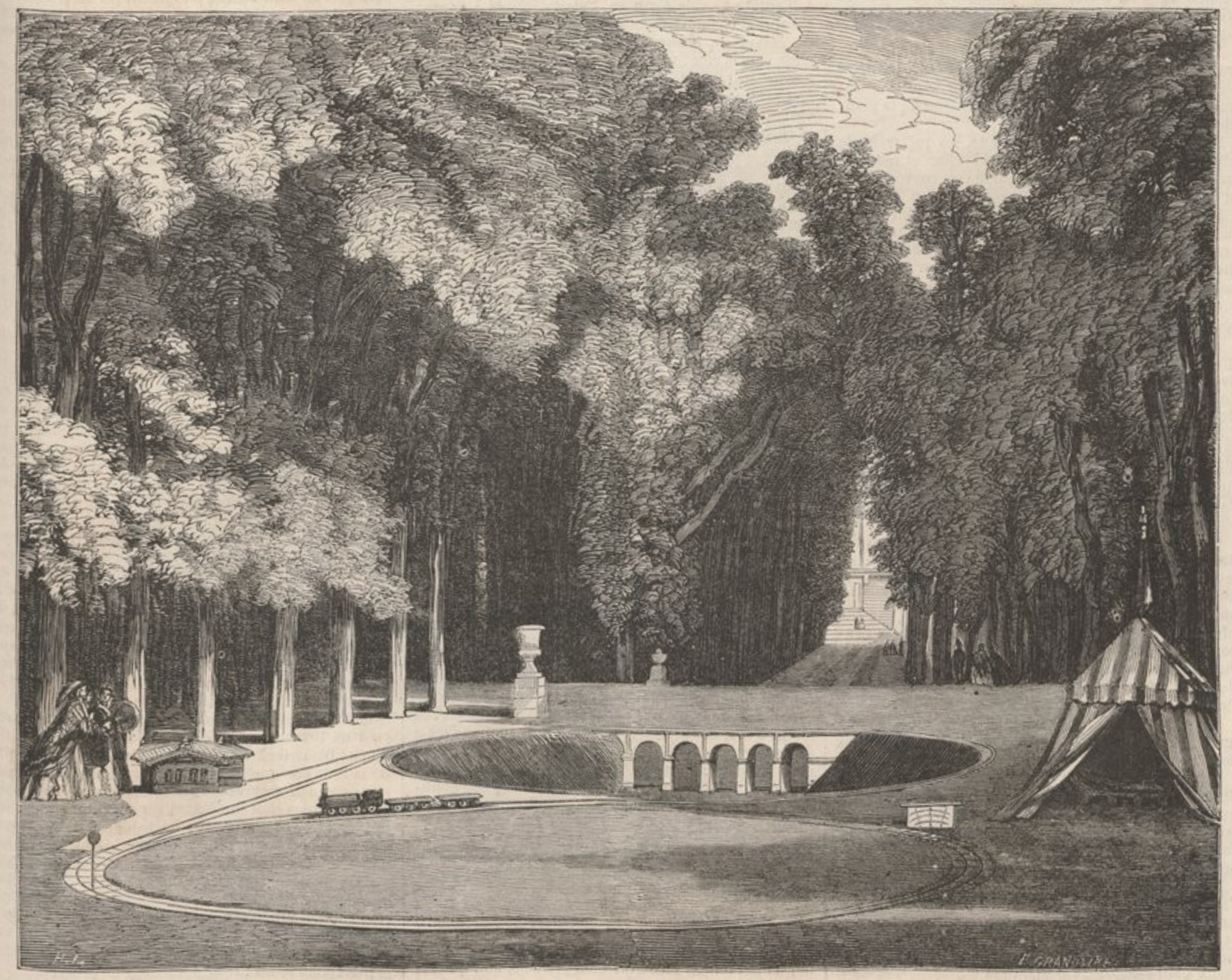
The railway of the Prince Imperial was installed between the bassins des Trois Bouillons and des Chiens in 1859.

- Railway of the Prince Imperial
- List of Baroque residences
