= Pavillon de Breteuil =

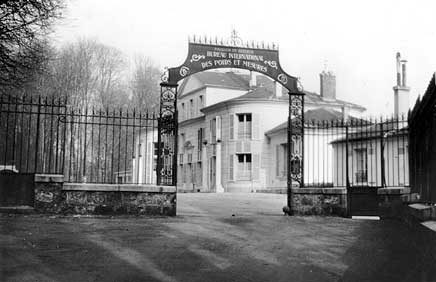
- Interactive map of the Pavillon de Breteuil area
- Former names: Trianon de Saint-Cloud; Pavillon du Mail; Pavillon d'Italie

General information
- Location: Parc de Saint-Cloud, 12 bis Grande Rue, Sèvres, Saint-Cloud, France
- Coordinates: 48°49′45.55″N 2°13′12.64″E
- Inaugurated: 1672

Design and construction
- Architect: Thomas Gobert

The Pavillon de Breteuil (French pronunciation: [pavijɔ̃ d(ə) bʁətœj]) is a building in the southeastern section of the Parc de Saint-Cloud in Saint-Cloud, France, to the southwest of Paris. It is listed in France as a historic monument. Since 1875 it has been the headquarters of the International Bureau of Weights and Measures (BIPM).

== History ==
Built overlooking the River Seine by Thomas Gobert in the parkland surrounding the Château de Saint-Cloud, the building was inaugurated by Louis XIV in 1672 and first known as the Trianon de Saint-Cloud. The Trianon was renamed as the Pavillon du Mail in 1743 after being slightly modified.

In 1785 the whole of the château estate (the Domaine de Saint-Cloud), including the pavillon, was acquired by Marie Antoinette, the queen of Louis XVI. For his part in arranging the acquisition of the pavillon, the queen granted Louis Auguste Le Tonnelier de Breteuil the use of the estate, and he made the pavillon his official residence, and it was renamed to the Pavillon de Breteuil.

During the French Revolution (1789–99), Breteuil fled from France, and the state took ownership of the pavillon. Following the revolution, the pavillon was renovated by Napoleon, renamed as the Pavillon d'Italie. Until the fall of Napoleon in 1815, it was used as accommodation for visiting royalty.

Following another restoration started in 1817, the pavillon, now the Pavillon de Breteuil again, was used as the official residence of a series of officials and dignitaries up until the start of the Franco-Prussian War (1870–71). In 1870, as a result of shelling during that war, the château was destroyed and the pavillon was badly damaged.

== Usage ==
In 1875, the Diplomatic Conference of the Metre in Paris, which had been convened by the French government to try to reach an agreement on international collaboration for the maintenance and development of the metric system, established the International Bureau of Weights and Measures (BIPM). To facilitate its work on the formulation of international standards, the French government offered the use of a site in the Domaine de Saint-Cloud, which included the badly war-damaged Pavillon de Breteuil.

Following an agreement signed on 25 April 1969 with the French government, functional privileges and immunities were granted to the BIPM as an international organisation operating on the site of the Pavillon de Breteuil.

It is the home of the International Prototype of the Kilogram, which lost its status as a standard on 20 May 2019.

Since 1900, the building has been listed as part of the Domaine national de Saint-Cloud as an historic monument in France.
