= Thomas Gobert (architect) =

French architect and engineer

Thomas Gobert (c. 1630 or 1640 – c. 1708) was a 17th-century French architect and engineer.

== Biography ==
He is credited with the construction of the Trianon de Saint-Cloud, since transformed into the pavillon de Breteuil, in the parc of Saint-Cloud, begun in 1670 and completed in 1680. One of the ponds bears his name.

He built the water supply network for the "lower gravity ponds" from Trappes, Arcy and Saclay to supply water to the park of the Château de Versailles between 1678 and 1680.

He erected the aqueduc de Buc between 1684 and 1686 and built the hôtel de Sénecterre, rue de l'Université in Paris, at the end of the 17th century.

He also made a bronze equestrian statue of Louis XIV, preserved in the Louvre. He was also involved in the construction of the collégiale Notre-Dame de Vitry-le-François, in which he realized the southern chapels and the nave. For the latter, vaulted, high and bright, he showed architectural audacity by removing the third pillar to replace it with an arch in the form of an anse de panier, a rare, even unique, configuration in France.

In 1699, Louis XIV appointed him a member of the Académie royale d'architecture, one of the seven first-class academicians.

In 1662, he was married with Marie Delespine, sister of Nicolas II Delespine, of whom he had a son, Claude-Thomas Gobert, architect, whom he disinherited after his marriage which he did not approve.

== Publications ==
- Thomas Gobert, Traité pour la pratique des forces mouvantes, qui fait connoistre l'impossibilité du mouvement perpétuel par la nécessité de l'équilibre et une supputation de la pesanteur du globe de la terre, avec un moyen pour le soûtenir par démonstration : précedé d'un discours sur la certitude, l'etendue & l'utilité des mathematiques, Jean-Baptiste Delespine, Paris, 1702 Read online
- Thomas Gobert, Nouveau sistème sur la construction et les mouvemens du monde, avec une dissertation sur la ligne de niveau, Jean-Baptiste Delespine, Paris, 1703 Read online

== Bibliography ==
- Frédéric Tiberghien, Versailles. Le chantier de Louis XIV 1662-1715, p. 25,36, 46, 51, 74, 84, 86, 230, 239, 240, 242, 245, 246, 292, 325, éditions Perrin, Paris, 2002 ISBN 2-262-01926-6
- Henry Lemonnier, W. Viennot, Procès-verbaux de l'Académie Royale d'Architecture, 1671-1793, volume X Table générale, p. 118, Armand Colin publisher, Paris, 1926 Read online
