= Charles-Louis Michelez =

French photographer and Lithographer

Charles-Louis Michelez (1817 – May 21, 1894) was a French photographer and lithographer.

== Biography ==
Charles-Louis Michelez was born in Paris, the son of Charles Louis and Félicité Michelez née Morin. He was married to Alicia Roux.

He took a photograph of the Railway of the Prince Imperial in 1859, which is the oldest known photograph of a model railway in the world.

He then specialized in photographing works of art. In 1861 he exhibited during the National Art Show and Exhibition a series of photographs of Gustave Doré's original drawings for The Inferno in the photography room of the Academic Salon. In 1867 he took five photographs at the Exposition Universelle in Paris.

From 1874 to 1884 he had a photographic studio in Paris.

== His photographs ==
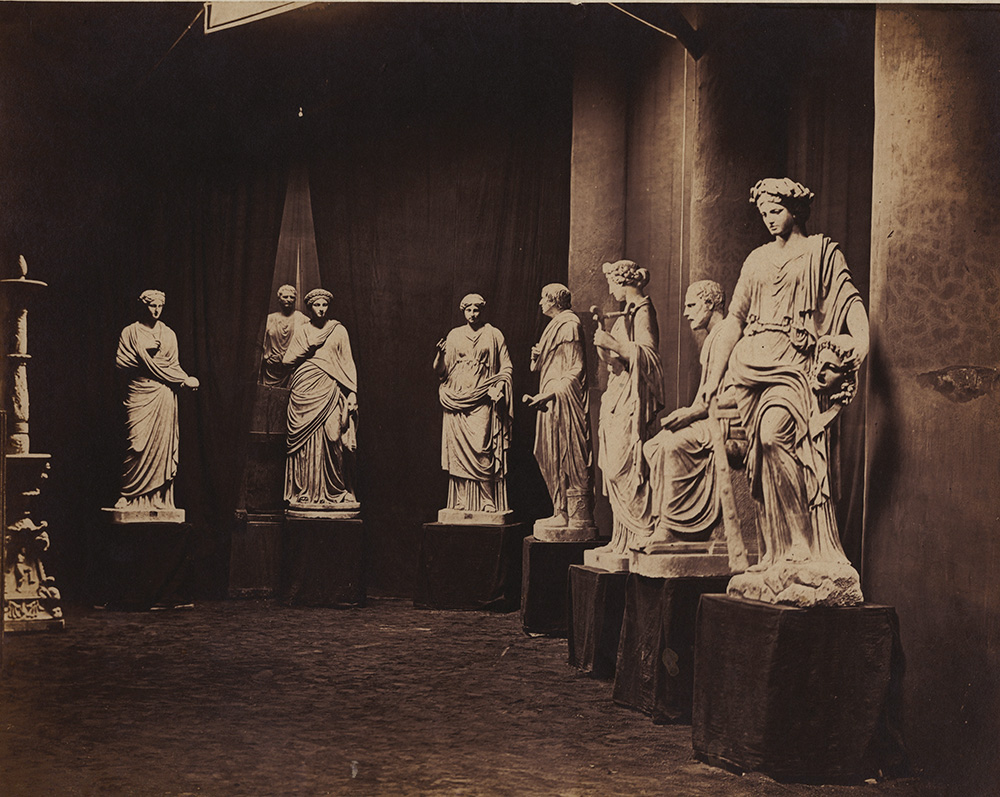
Sculptures exhibited at the Exposition Universelle of 1867, Paris

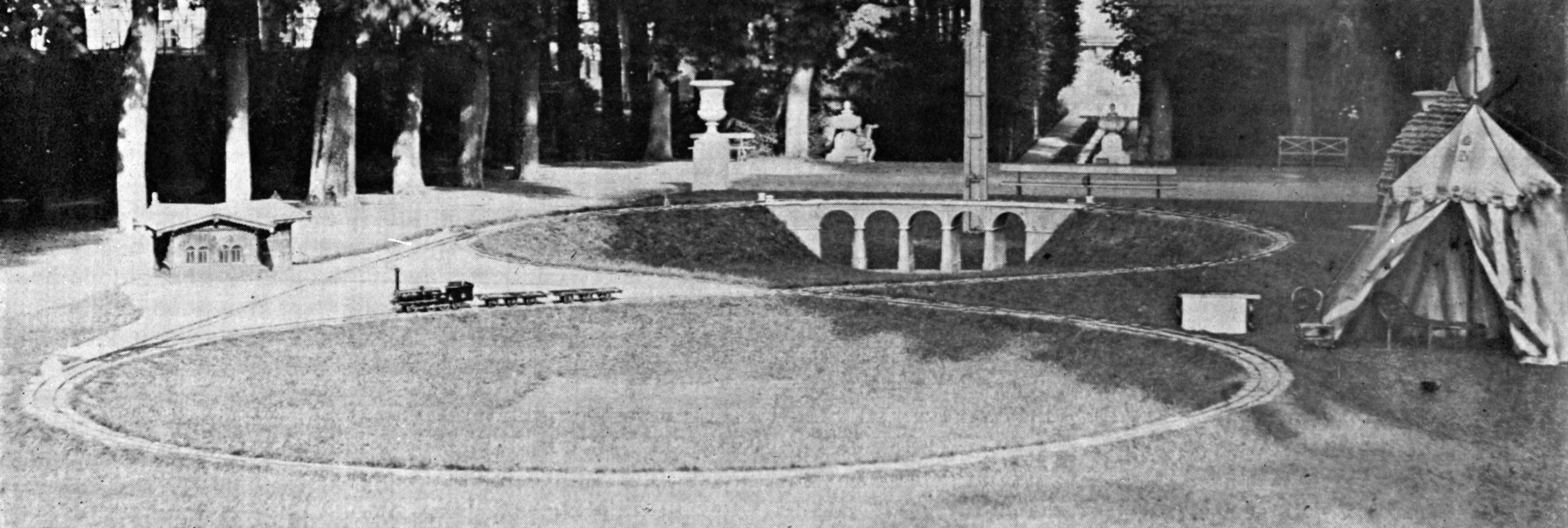
Railway of the Prince Imperial, 1859

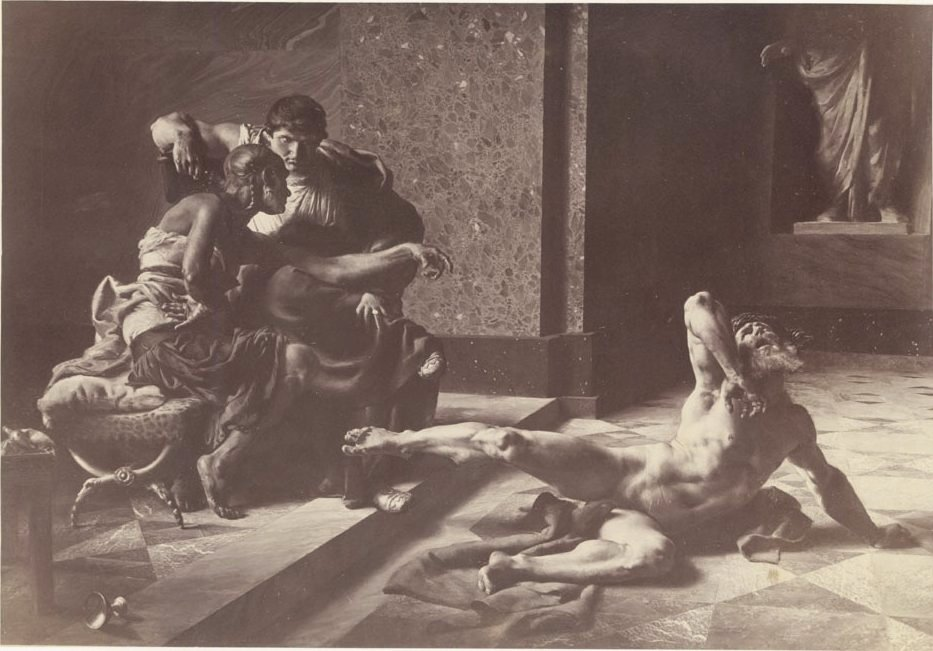
Photograph of a painting by Joseph-Noël Sylvestre
