= France Crowning Art and Industry =

Sculpture group in France

Coordinates: 48.83507°N 2.21987°E

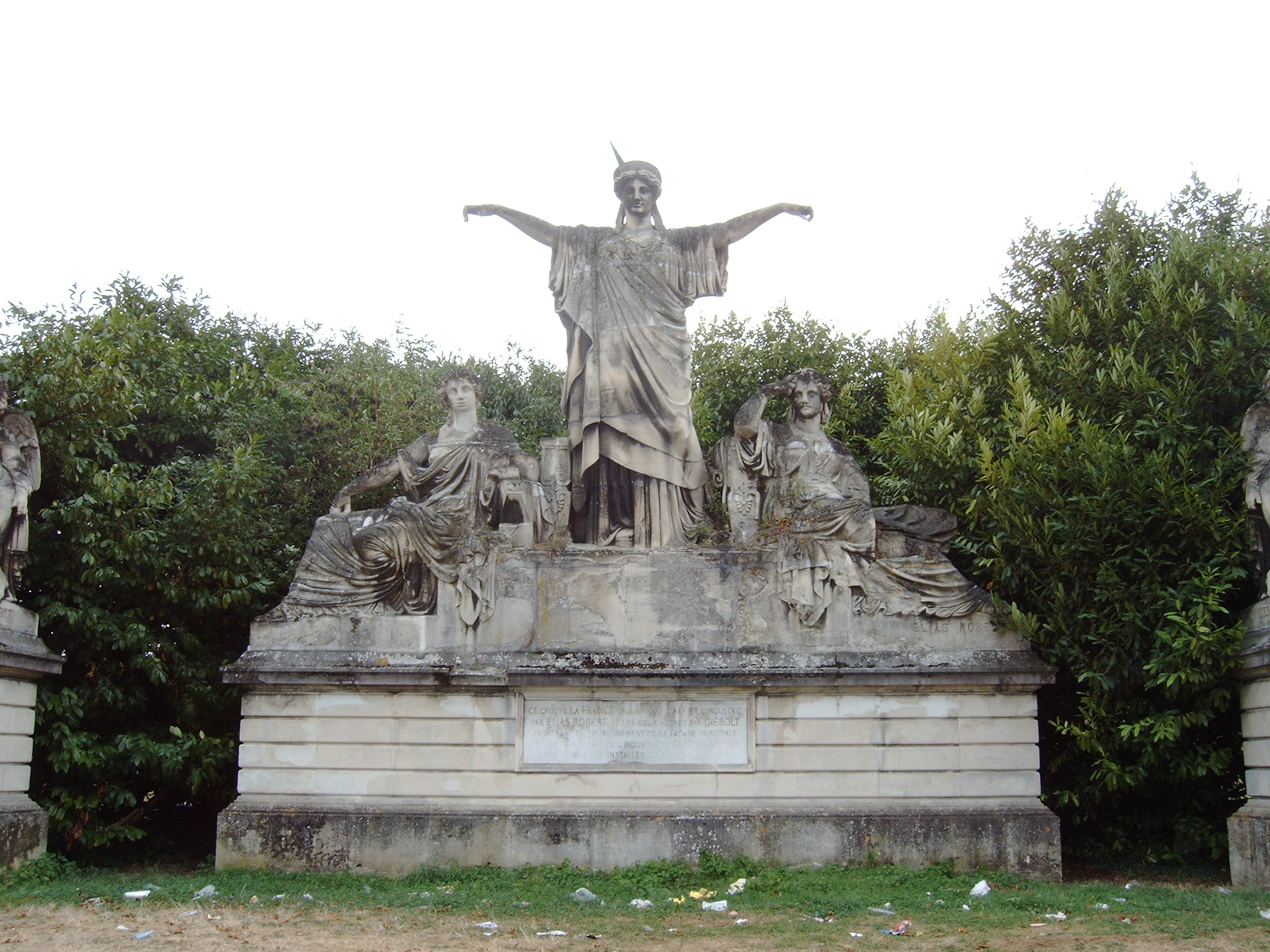
The main group, sculpted by Élias Robert

France Crowning Art and Industry (French: La France couronnant l'Art et l'Industrie) is a 6.50 m (21 ft) tall limestone sculpture group which decorated the top of the entrance of Palais de l'Industrie, the main building of the 1855 international exhibition in Paris. It was moved to the park of Saint-Cloud in 1900 when the Palais de l'Industrie was demolished. The center group, topped by three personifications of France, Art and Industry, is a work by the sculptor Élias Robert. The two putti groups located on its sides are by Georges Diebolt. The wreaths France was carrying in her hands and most of the rays of the radiant crown she wears have been lost.

== Precedents and influences ==
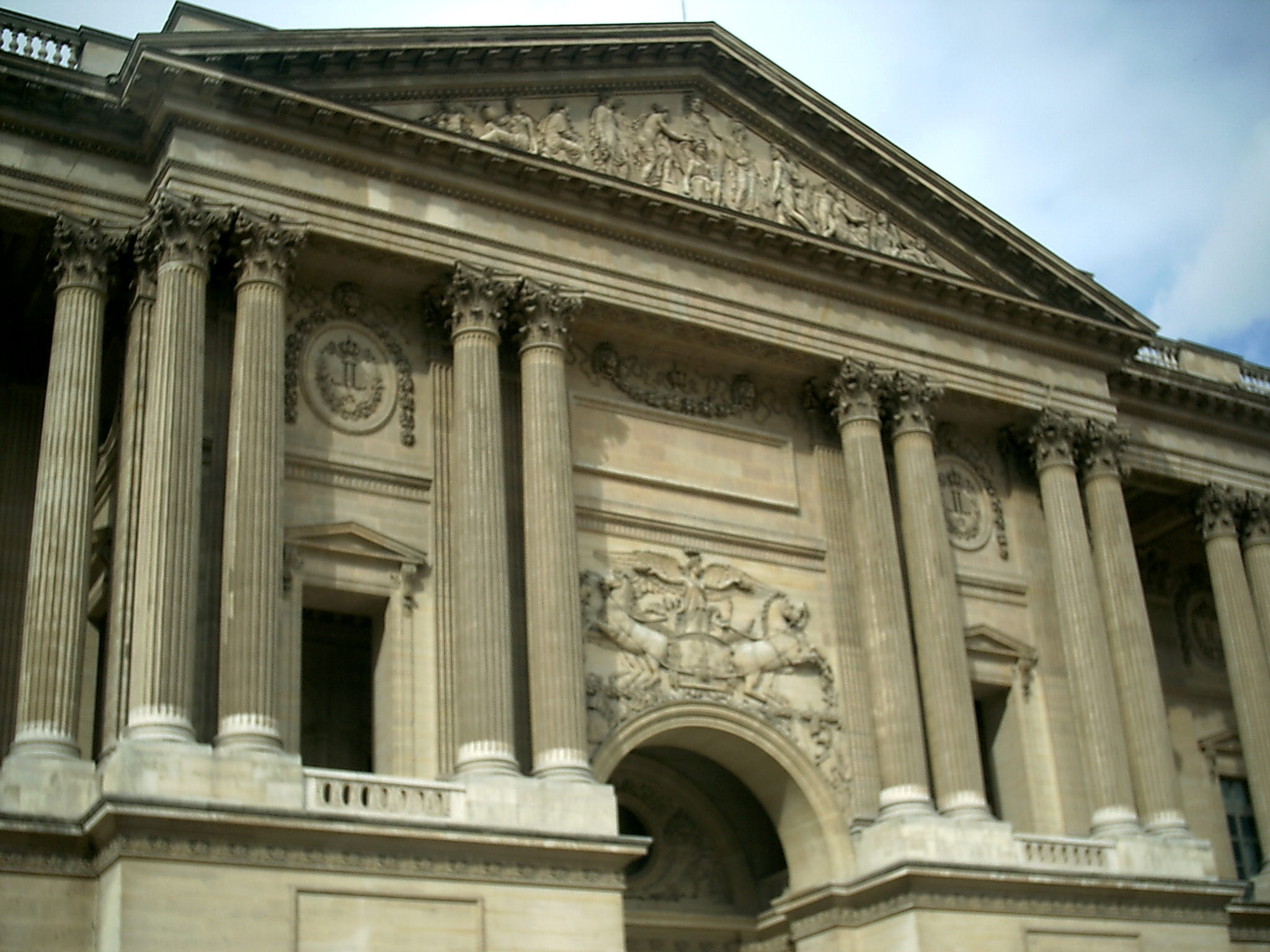
East entrance of the Louvre, showing the bas-relief Victory in a quadriga distributing wreaths

This sculpture is thought to have been inspired by Pierre Cartellier's bas-relief Victory in a quadriga distributing wreaths (1810), at the East entrance of the Louvre palace, and to be a possible inspiration for the Statue of Liberty in New York City.

A bas-relief on the same subject, entitled France distributing wreaths to the Arts and Industry, was sculpted by Jean-Baptiste Louis Roman in 1830 and is located on the wall behind the seat of the president of the National Assembly in the hemicycle of Palais Bourbon.

In 1851, Georges Diebolt sculpted La France rémunératrice (Remunerative France), a colossal female figure wearing and distributing wreaths, for an award ceremony on the Champs-Élysées, which was held for the French industrialists who had been distinguished at the London Great Exhibition. A small size bronze reduction was exhibited at the Exposition Universelle of 1855, and is now displayed at the Musée d'Orsay.

== Gallery ==
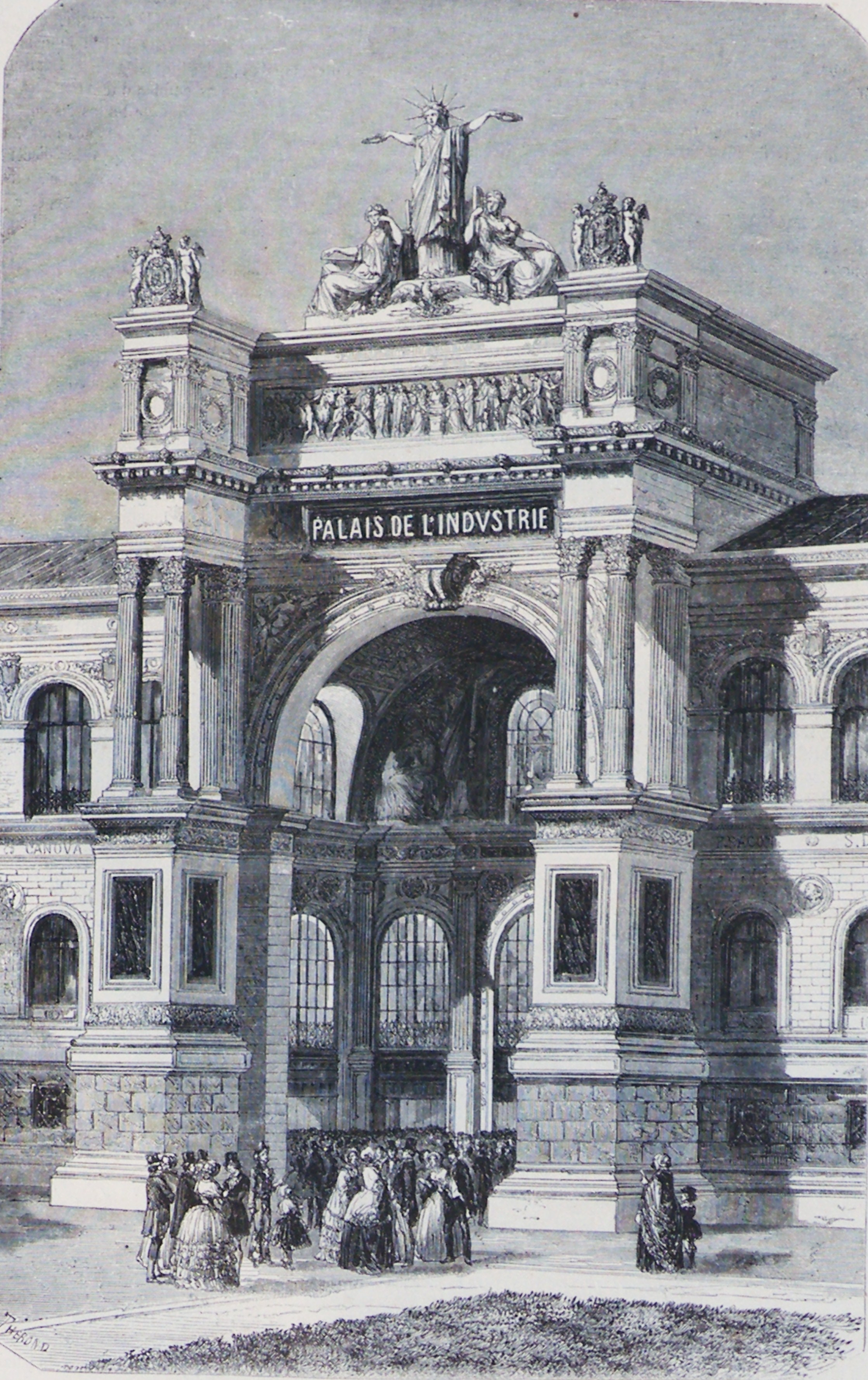
Entrance of the Palais de l'Industrie (1855)

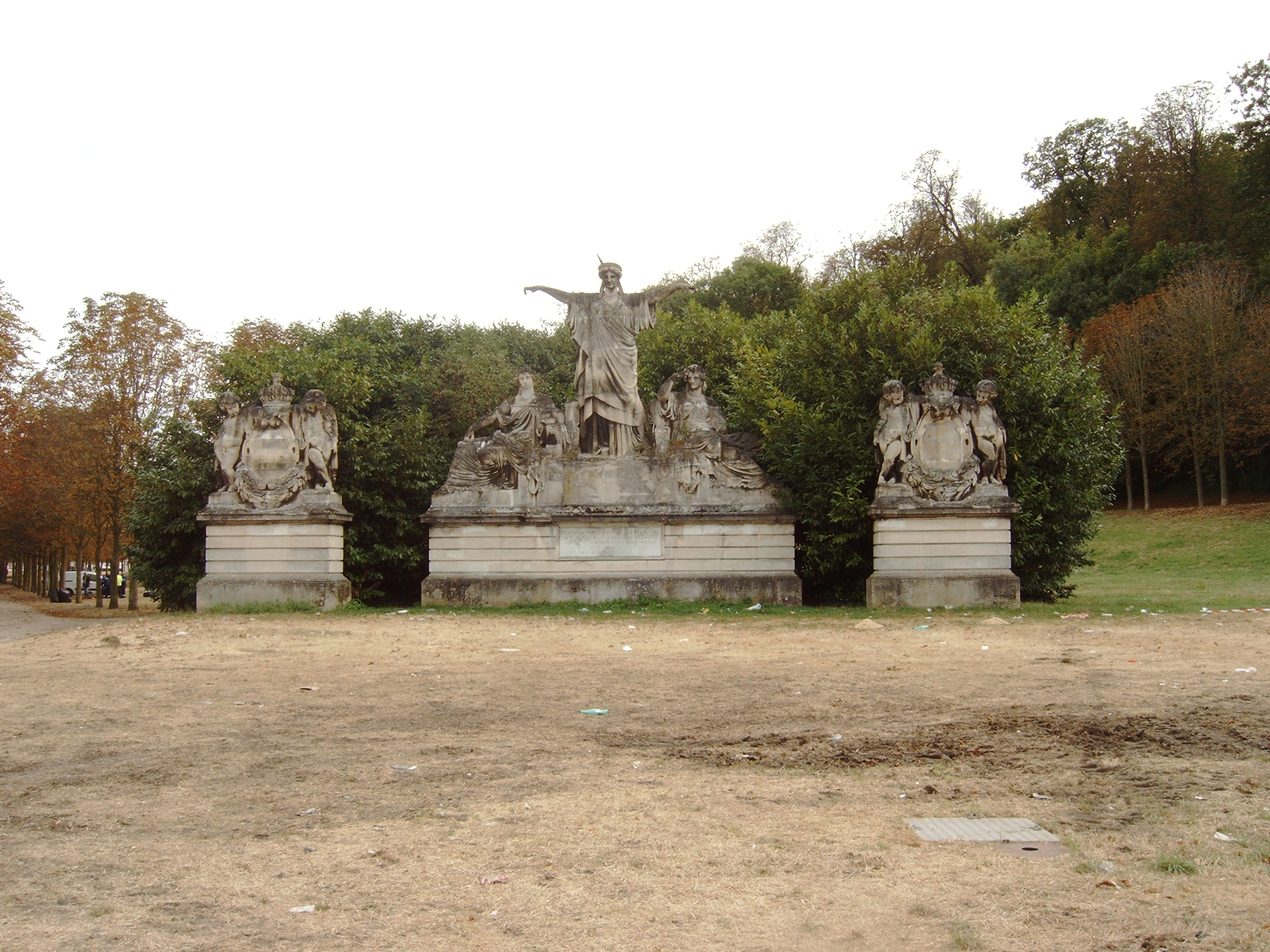
General view (2009)

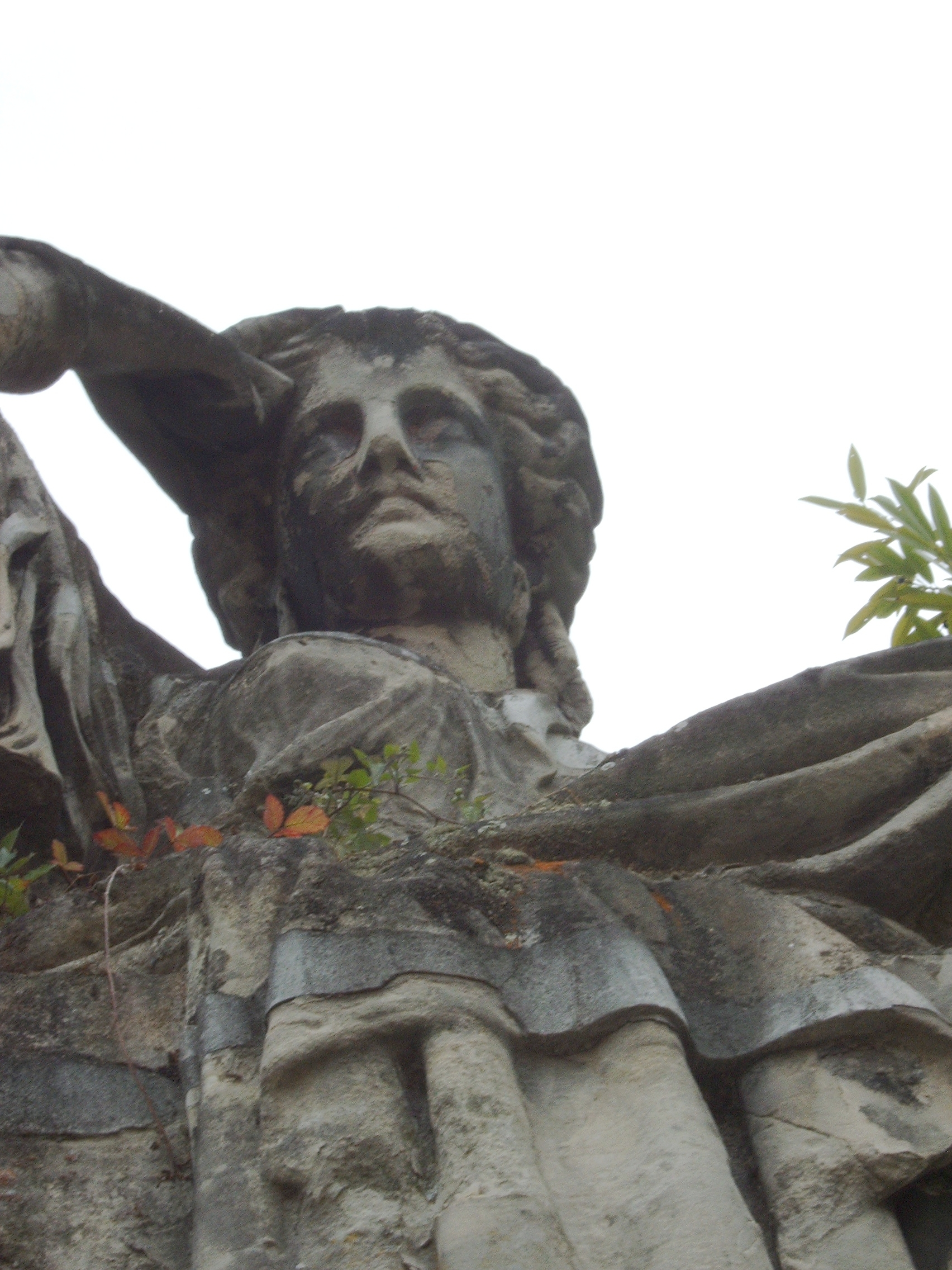
Allegory of Art

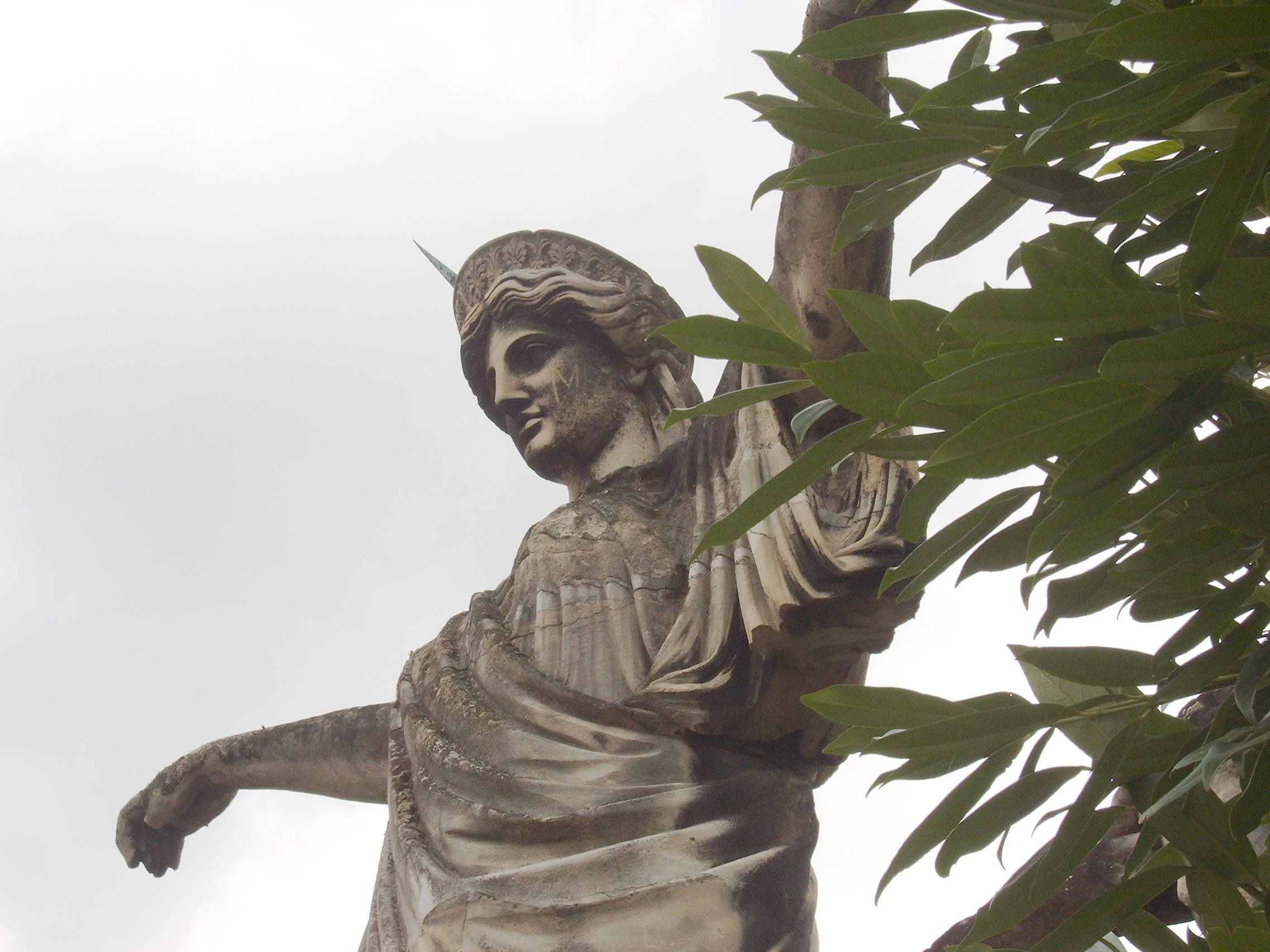
Allegory of France, with her sole remaining radiant crown ray

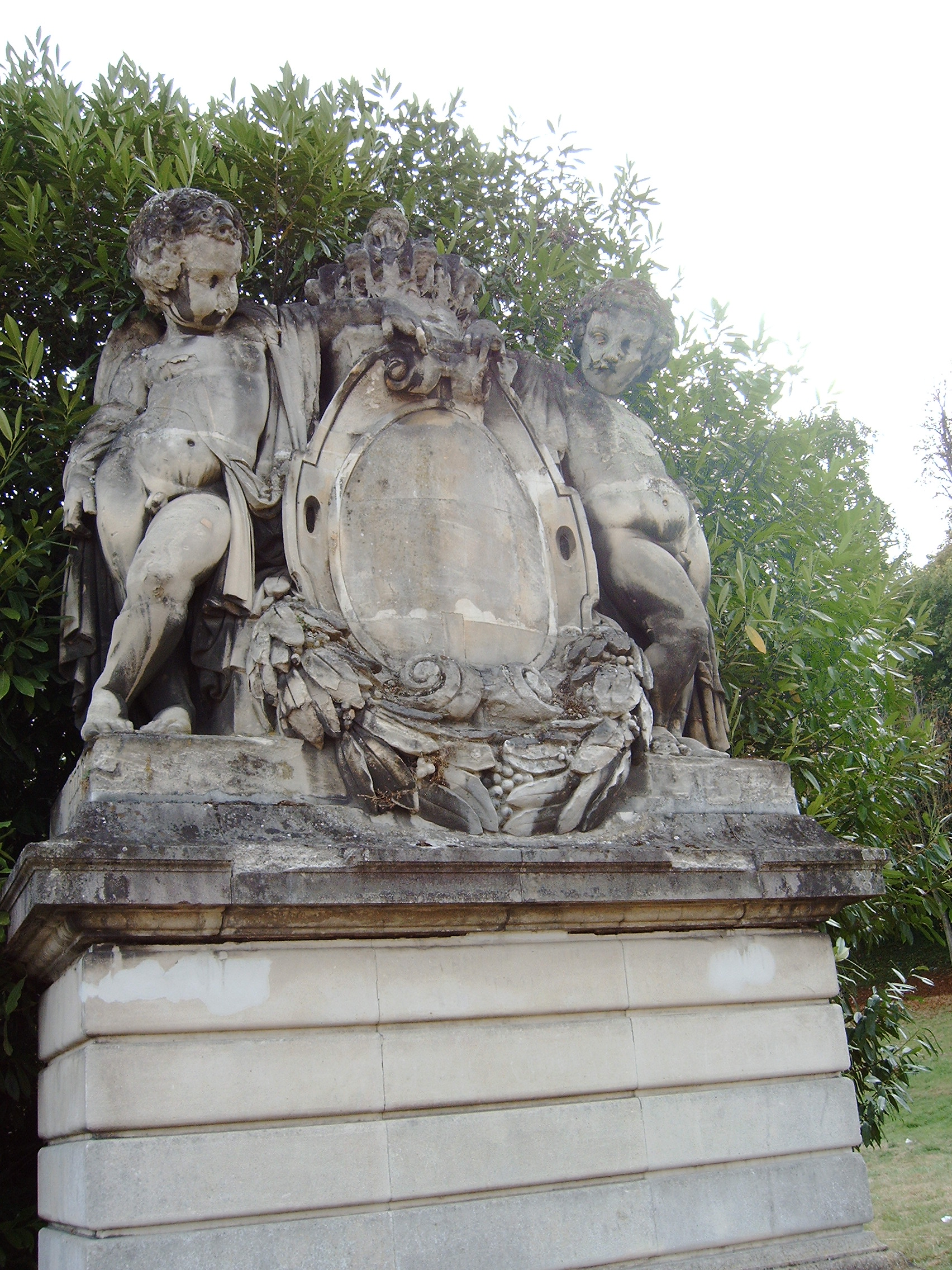
Right putti group (by Diebolt)

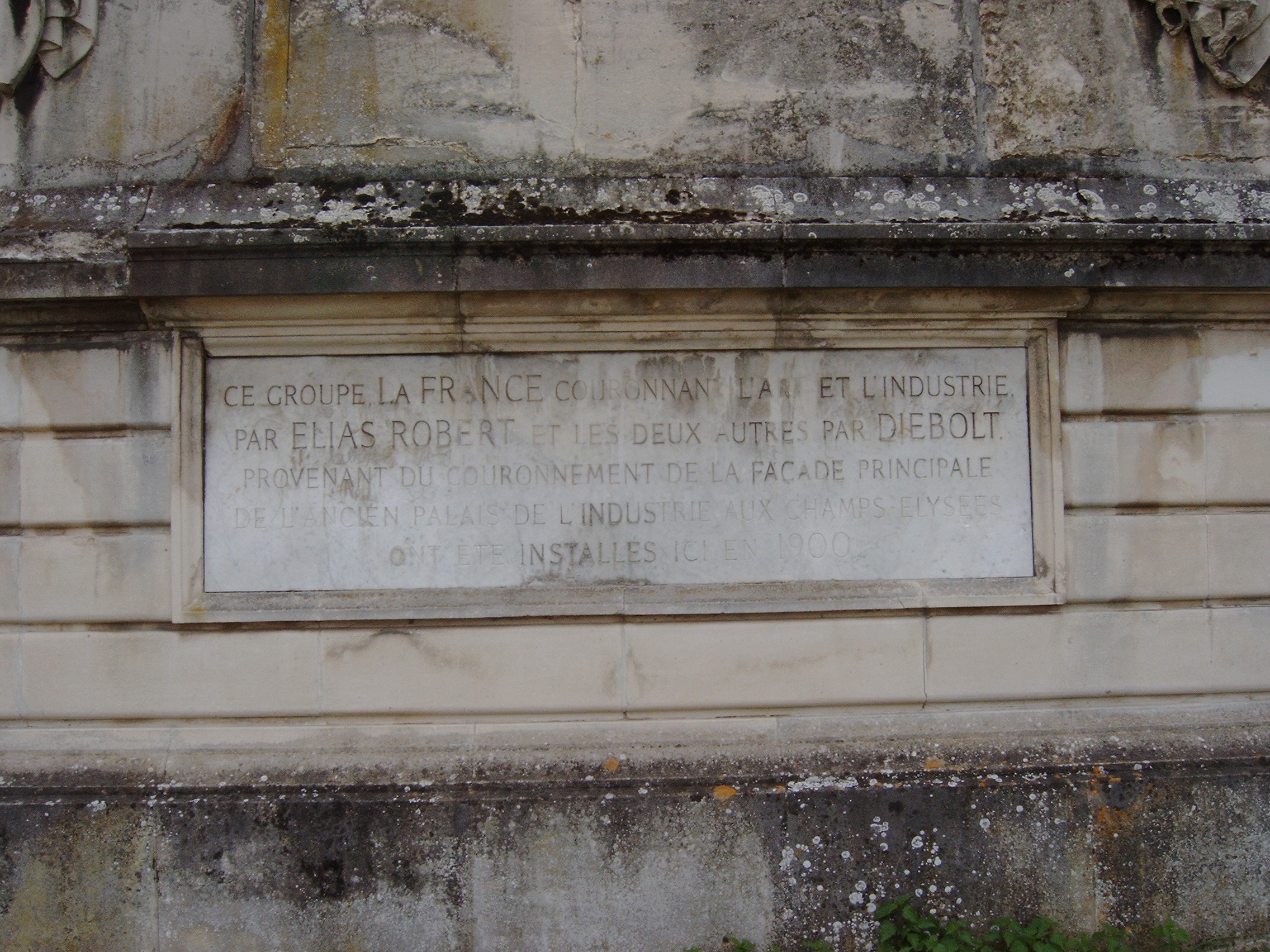
Plaque, recalling the transfer from Paris to Saint-Cloud in 1900
