= Railway of the Prince Imperial =

First documented model railway

Coordinates: 48.8371°N 2.2134°E

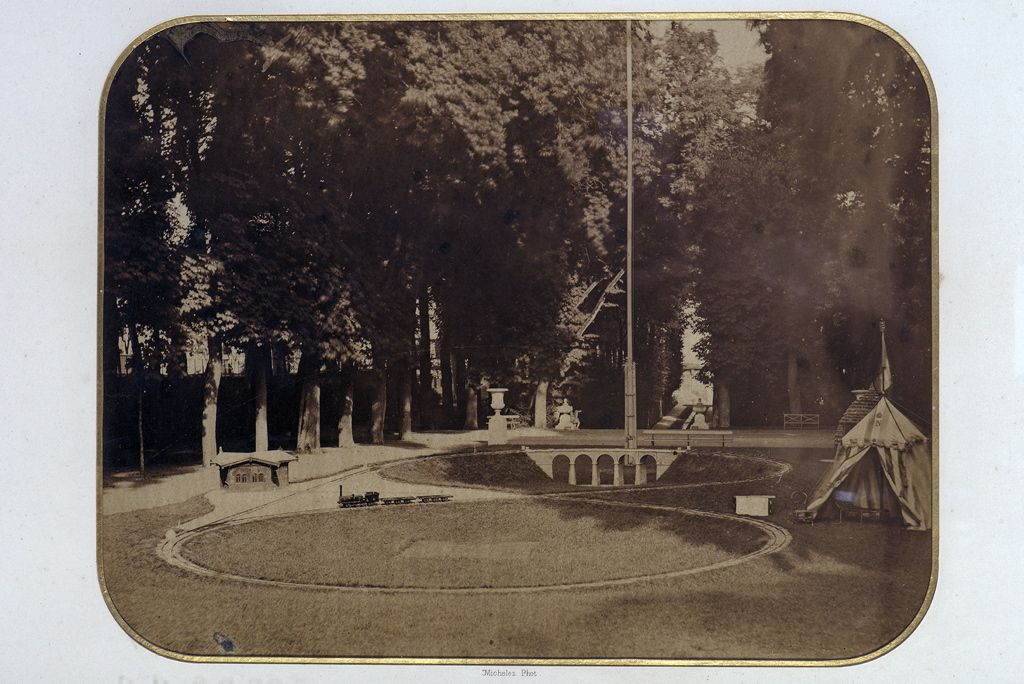
Photograph of the railway of the Prince Imperial taken 1859 by Charles-Louis Michelez (1817-1883)

The railway of the Prince Imperial (French: Chemin de fer du Prince impérial) was the first documented model railway in the world.

== Location ==
The model railway was built in 1859 for Napoléon, Prince Imperial, the 3-year-old son of emperor Napoleon III, in the private park of the Château de Saint-Cloud, between the Bassin des Trois Bouillons and the Bassin des Chiens.

== Description ==
The model railway was described in the 8 October 1859 issue of the magazine Le Monde Illustré:

The railway built for the amusement of the Prince Imperial is a real toy as well as a masterpiece of mechanical science. It has been set up in a corner of the private park of Saint-Cloud. Its track is in the shape of a figure 8, and the curvature of its tiny rails is reminiscent of the surprising curves of the railway from Paris to Sceaux. It has a small station, its small viaducts, its small bridges, its small inclines and ramps. The engine, which is about fifty centimetres wide, has wheels driven by an internal spring which can be wound up as desired.

The photograph of the railway of the Prince Imperial is the oldest known photograph of a model railroad and shows that the clockwork-driven tender engine had six wheels (0-6-0T) and pulled two three-axle flat wagons. The station building stood on a straight by-pass, connected by two sets of points to the figure-of-eight loop.

== Historic documents ==
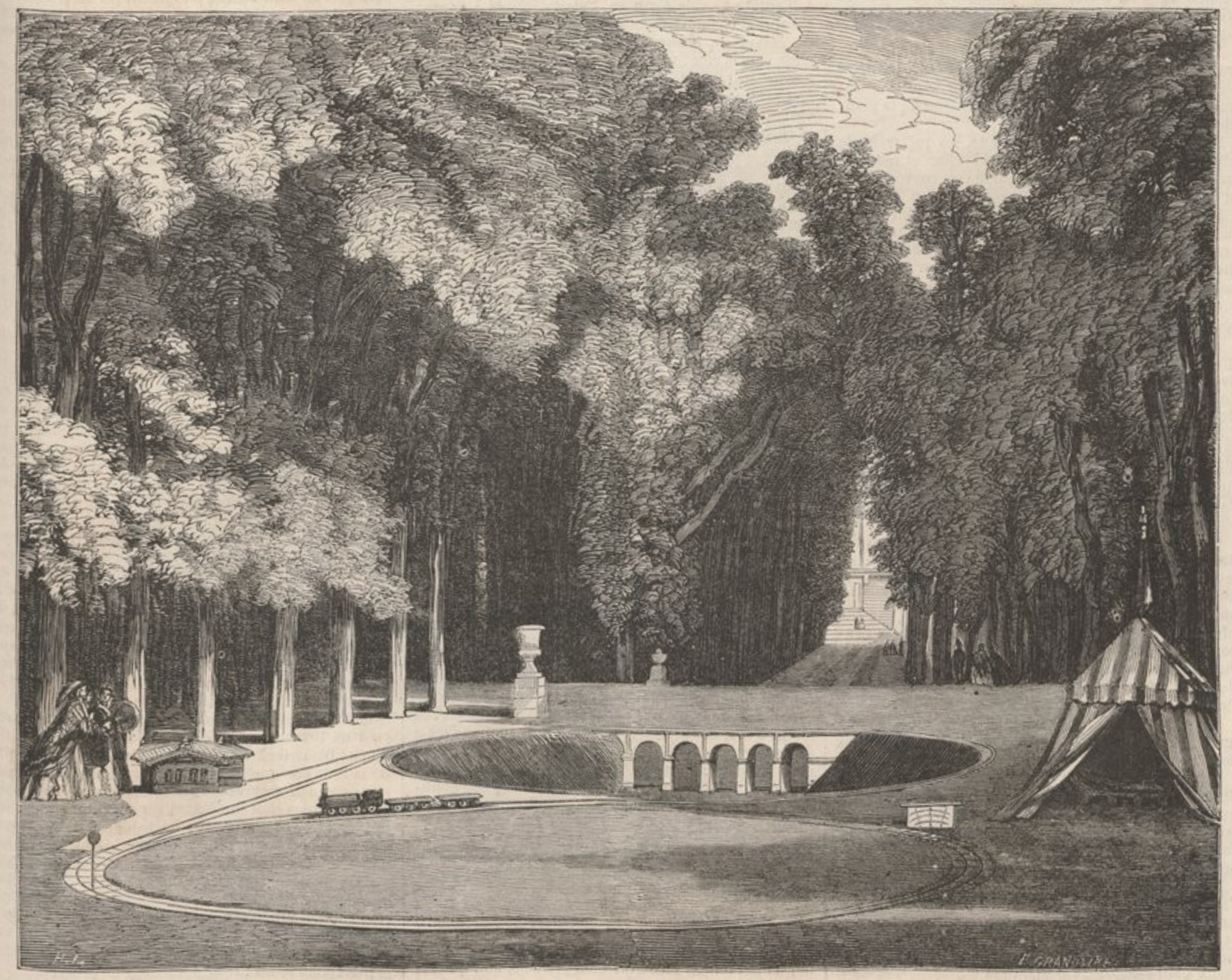
Woodcut by E. Grangile from a photograph by Charles-Louis Michelez, Le Monde Illustré, 8 October 1859

The article in Le Monde Illustré is the only known description of the railway of the Prince Imperial. The illustration which shows the complete set-up was a woodcut after a photograph by the Parisian photographer Charles-Louis Michelez. The photograph was reproduced by Gustav Reder in 1970. He estimated the gauge to be approximately 20 cm (8 in), while Le Monde Illustré gave a width of about 50 cm (20 in) for the locomotive.

It is not known who built the track and the rolling stock, or for how long the railway was used and kept in the park.
