= Nicolas II Delespine =

French master mason, entrepreneur and architect (1642–1729)

Nicolas Delespine (1642 in Paris – December 1729 in Paris) was a French master mason, entrepreneur and architect. He belonged to a dynasty of Parisian master masons.

== Biography ==
The dynasty of Parisian master masons and contractors was established by Simon Delespine (around 1600-1675), adviser to the king, general master of his buildings and of the French bridges and roads.

The genealogy of the architects Delespine was studied by Mireille Rambaud. Their family tree is given in "Documents du minutier central concernant l'histoire de l'art", volume II, 1971, published by the Archives Nationales. Several members of the family have the same first names - Alexandre, Nicolas, Pierre, Jules - and they should not be misidentified.

Nicolas II Delespine is often mistaken with his cousin, Nicolas I Delespine, son of Simon Delespine, or with Pierre-Nicolas Delespine, son of Nicolas I Delespine.

In 1676 he was one of the contractors carrying out the works of modernization of the judicial premises of the Grand Châtelet conceived by Libéral Bruant. In the same year he built a pavilion in the Hôpital des Enfants-Trouvés for Aligre's chancellor, Élisabeth Lhuillier, in the Faubourg Saint-Antoine. For this person he built the Chapel of Mercy in this hospital.

Delespine has distinguished himself more as an expert juror than as a builder. In July 1690 he bought an office as an expert bourgeois architect which he kept until his death. He appears on the list of 25 expert sworn architects whose offices were created by the edicts of May and December 1690, or "Édits de création des Experts" and published in the Royal Almanac from 1701.

In 1702, Delespine tendered the works of Jules Hardouin-Mansart at place Vendôme. He visited the rotunda of Valois in the abbey of Saint-Denis with Jean Beausire and concluded to the need to demolish it. In 1702 and 1704, he made with Lemaistre the expertise of the building of the Hotel des mousquetaires noirs erected by Jean Beausire and Charles Lemaire, in the faubourg Saint-Antoine.

He erected houses in the rue Sainte-Anne, rue de Cléry, rue Thérèse, rue des Moulins.

In the Procès-verbaux de l'Académie royale d'architecture, Henry Lemonnier distingues two Delespine, father and son, members of the Académie royale d'architecture. This distinction between two Delespine comes from the fact that this name appears both in the first and second classes without chronological logic. Before the reform of the Academy imposed by the letters patent of April 1717, the organization of the Academy allowed non-members to participate in meetings of the Academy and to sign the minutes. A Delespine is a member of the 2nd class of the academy in 1699. Nicolas II Delespine was appointed member of the 1st class of the Academy of Architecture by increasing the number of architects of the 1st class, in 1706 at the same time as Libéral Bruant and Pierre Cailleteau called "Lassurance". He signed the minutes of 1717. He was listed as a 2nd class architect in 1718. He was presented to be appointed architect of the 1st class on 4 March 1720 but was not chosen by the king.

His death was announced during the session of the Academy of Architecture on 5 December 1729.

== See also ==
- Académie royale d'architecture

== Bibliography ==
- Henry Lemonnier, W. Viennot, Procès-verbaux de l'Académie royale d'architecture, tome X, Table générale, p. 89, Librairie Armand Colin, Paris, Read online
- Mireille Rambaud, Une famille d'architectes : Les Delespine, p. 1-62, Archives de l'art français, Nouvelle période, tome XXIII, 1968
- Michel Gallet, Les architectes parisiens. Dictionnaire biographique et critique, p. 179-180, éditions Mengès, Paris, 1995 ISBN 978-2-8562-0370-5
- Henry Jouin, Notes sur divers artistes des deux derniers siècles. Contrat de mariage de Pierre de L'Espine et de Pierrette Hardouin, p. 49, Revue de l'art français ancien et moderne, 1891 Read online
- La grande encyclopédie : inventaire raisonné des sciences, des lettres et des arts, volume 13, Cotesbach-Dellden, p. 1179, H. Lamirault et Cie éditeurs, Paris Read online
