= Élias Robert =

French sculptor (1821–1874)

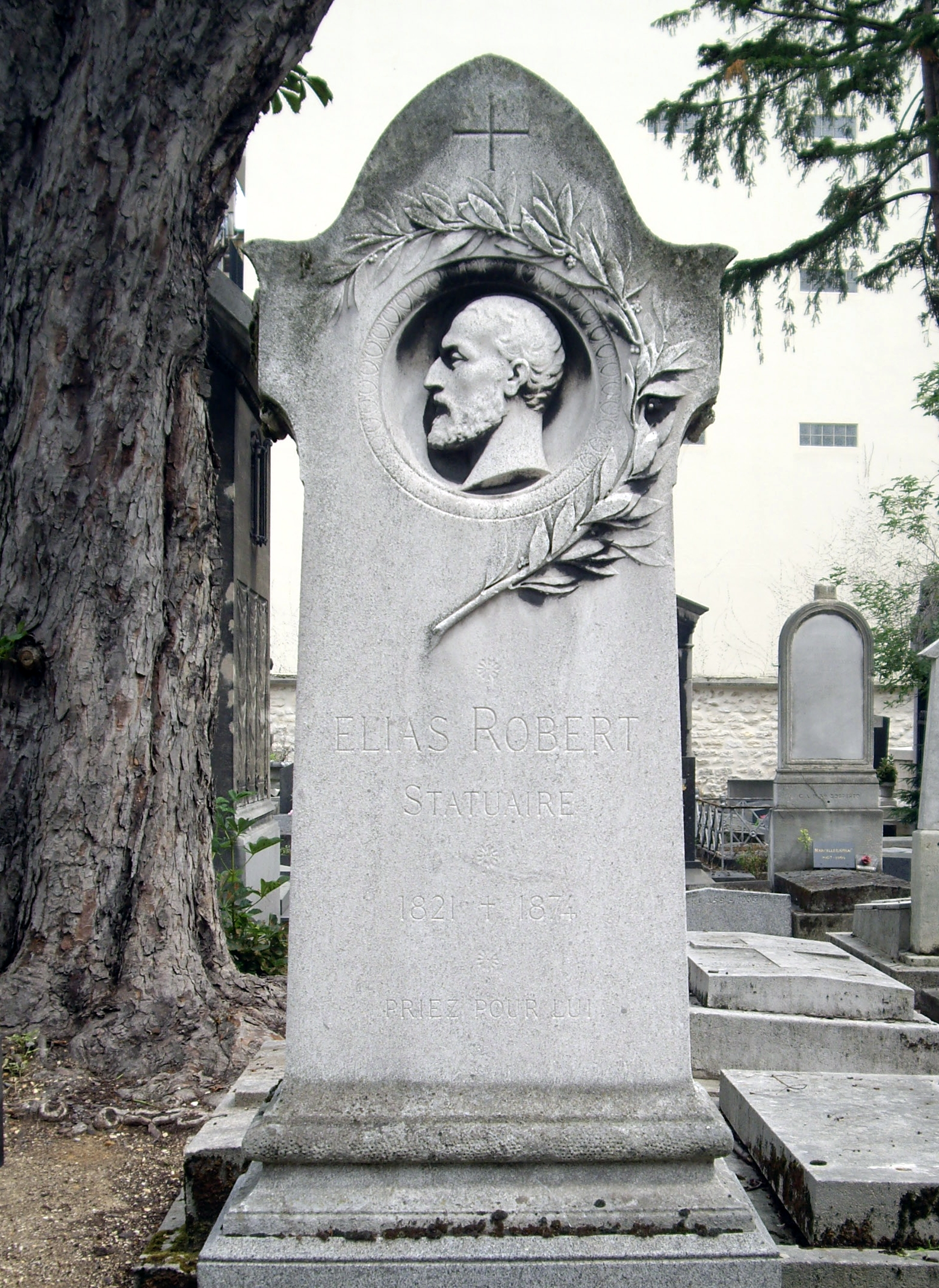
- Born: 6 June 1821; Étampes, France
- Died: 29 April 1874 (aged 52); Paris, France
- Occupation: sculptor
- Notable work: France Crowning Art and Industry

Louis Valentin Robert, called Élias Robert (6 June 1821, Étampes – 29 April 1874, Paris) was a French sculptor.

== Family ==
He had an older brother, also named Louis Valentin Robert, born 15 September 1819 (Étampes) died 2 October 1819 (Étampes).

== Career ==
Robert's major works include :

- Phryne, collection of the Louvre museum in Paris (1855)
- France Crowning Art and Industry, outdoor sculpture in Paris (1855)
- Justice, a bronze crowning one of the columns of the Fontaine Saint-Michel in Paris (1861)
- Agriculture and Industry, displayed on the main facade of the Gare d'Austerlitz train terminal in Paris (1868)
- the caryatid of the Conservatoire national des arts et métiers in Paris
- Column of Pedro IV, Rossio Square in Lisbon, Portugal (1870)

A collection of his work was donated to the city museum of Étampes after his death.
