= Parc de Saint-Cloud =

French national estate in Greater Paris

Coordinates: 48°50′15″N 2°12′53″E

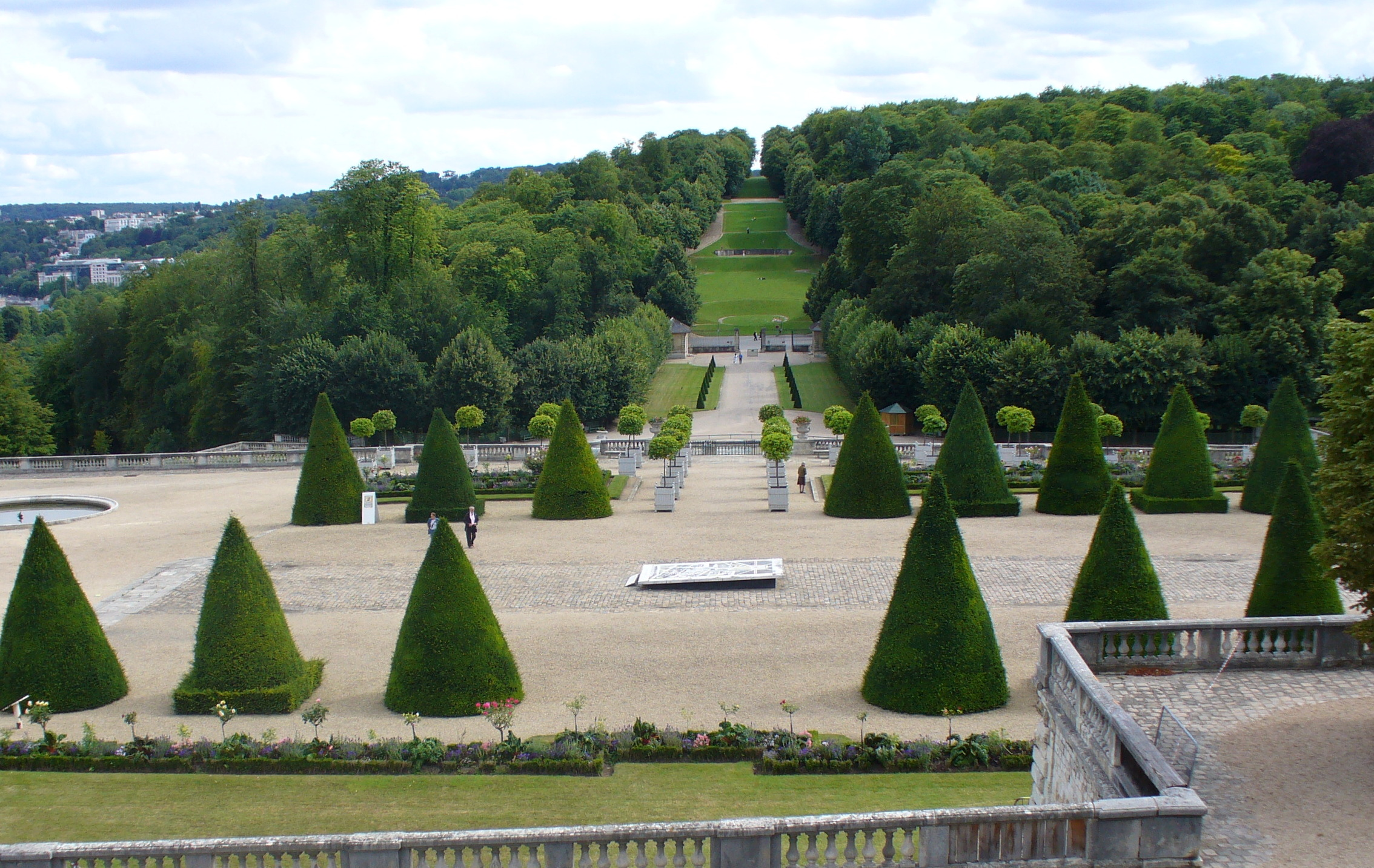
The location of the former Château de Saint-Cloud is marked by yew trees.

The Parc de Saint-Cloud (pronounced [paʁk də sɛ̃ klu]; Park of Saint-Cloud), officially the Domaine national de Saint-Cloud (pronounced [dɔmɛn nɑsjɔnal də sɛ̃ klu]; National Estate of Saint-Cloud), is a domaine national (national estate) located mostly within the Saint-Cloud commune, in the Hauts-de-Seine department, southwest of Paris, France.

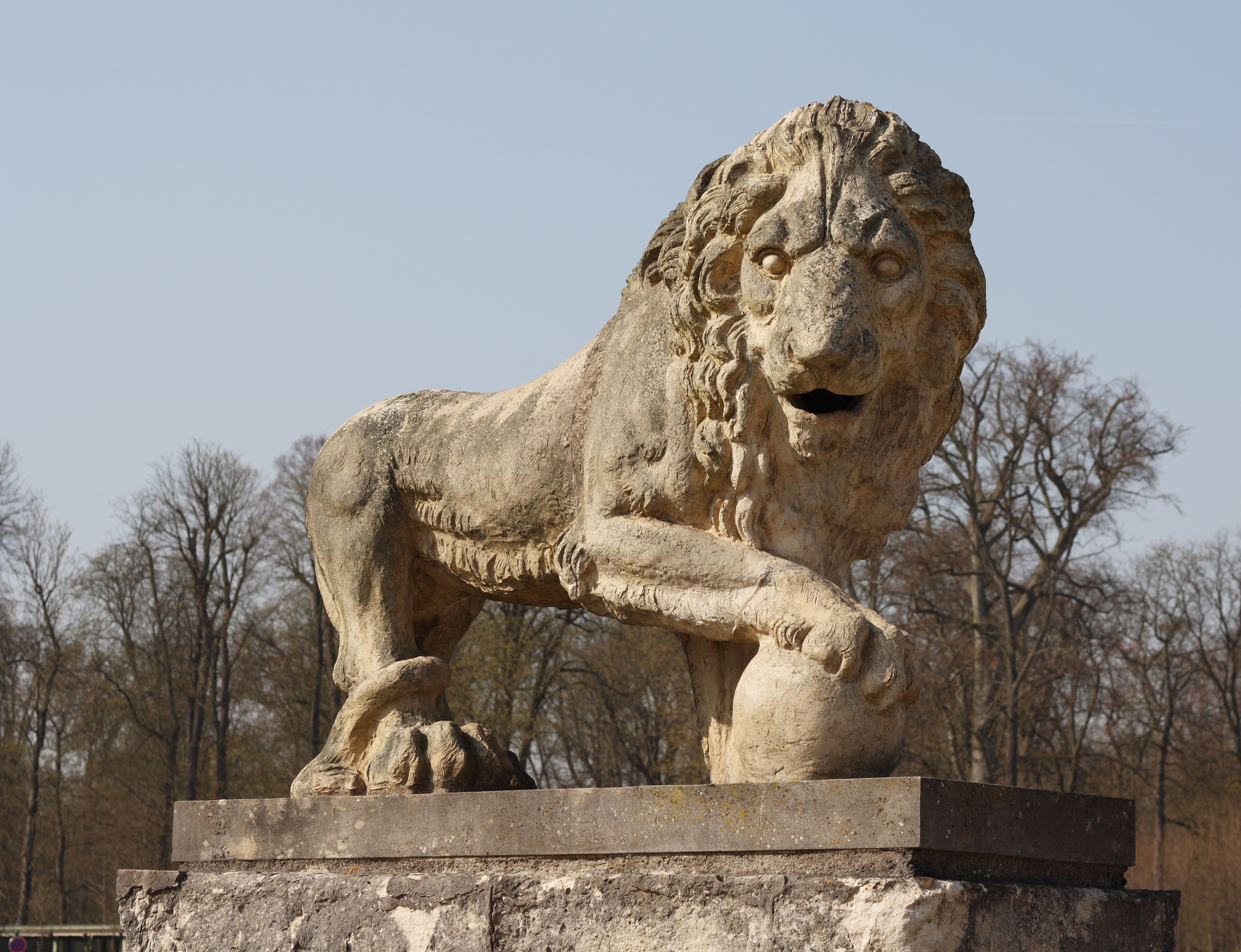
A Medici lion sculpture of unknown origin

The park, which covers 460 hectares (1,100 acres), was a nature reserve on the left bank of the Seine until 1923. It was centred around the former Château de Saint-Cloud, home of Philippe I, Duke of Orléans (1640–1701), which was destroyed by French bombing in 1870 during the Franco-Prussian War after the Prussians had made a base of it. The château was the meeting place of the Council of Five Hundred and Council of Ancients on 10 November 1799, the day following Napoleon's Coup of 18 Brumaire.

On 9 November 1994 the Parc de Saint-Cloud was classified as a historical monument. In 2005 it was awarded the Notable Garden status. The park is operated as a domaine national under the Ministry of Culture's Centre des monuments nationaux (CMN).

== History ==
The park is located on the site of the Château de Saint-Cloud, a residence of royal and imperial families from the 16th century.

After Napoleon III declared war on the Prussians, the site was occupied by a Prussian force which used the high outcropping to shell Paris. Counter-fire from the French caused the building to burn on 13 October 1870, as well as considerable damage to the town of Saint-Cloud. The structure was completely razed in August 1892, politicians under the Third Republic believing it represented a reminder of France's imperial past.

Only a few outbuildings remain from the original structure. The park contains a Le Nôtre-designed garden in the French style, an English landscape garden, in addition to Marie Antoinette's rose garden.

The park showcases a panoramic view of Paris called "La Lanterne" or the "Lantern of Demosthenes".

In 1999 a winter storm heavily damaged the park's forests. Some of the fallen trees' remains were later used for an art exhibition at the Jardin du Luxembourg's Orangerie in Paris.

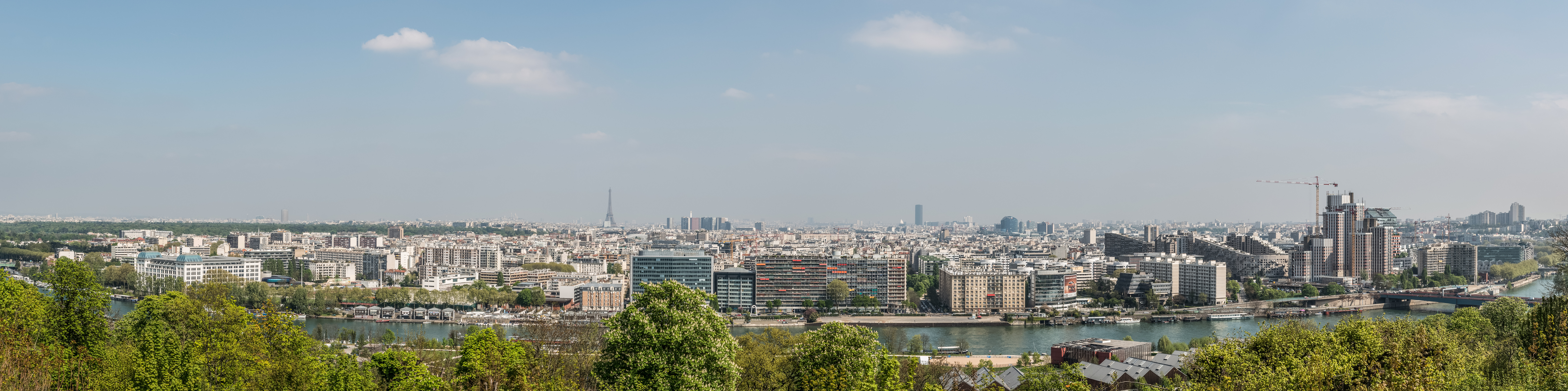
A panorama taken from the La Lanterne viewpoint, overlooking Paris and its inner suburbs

== Kandinsky series ==
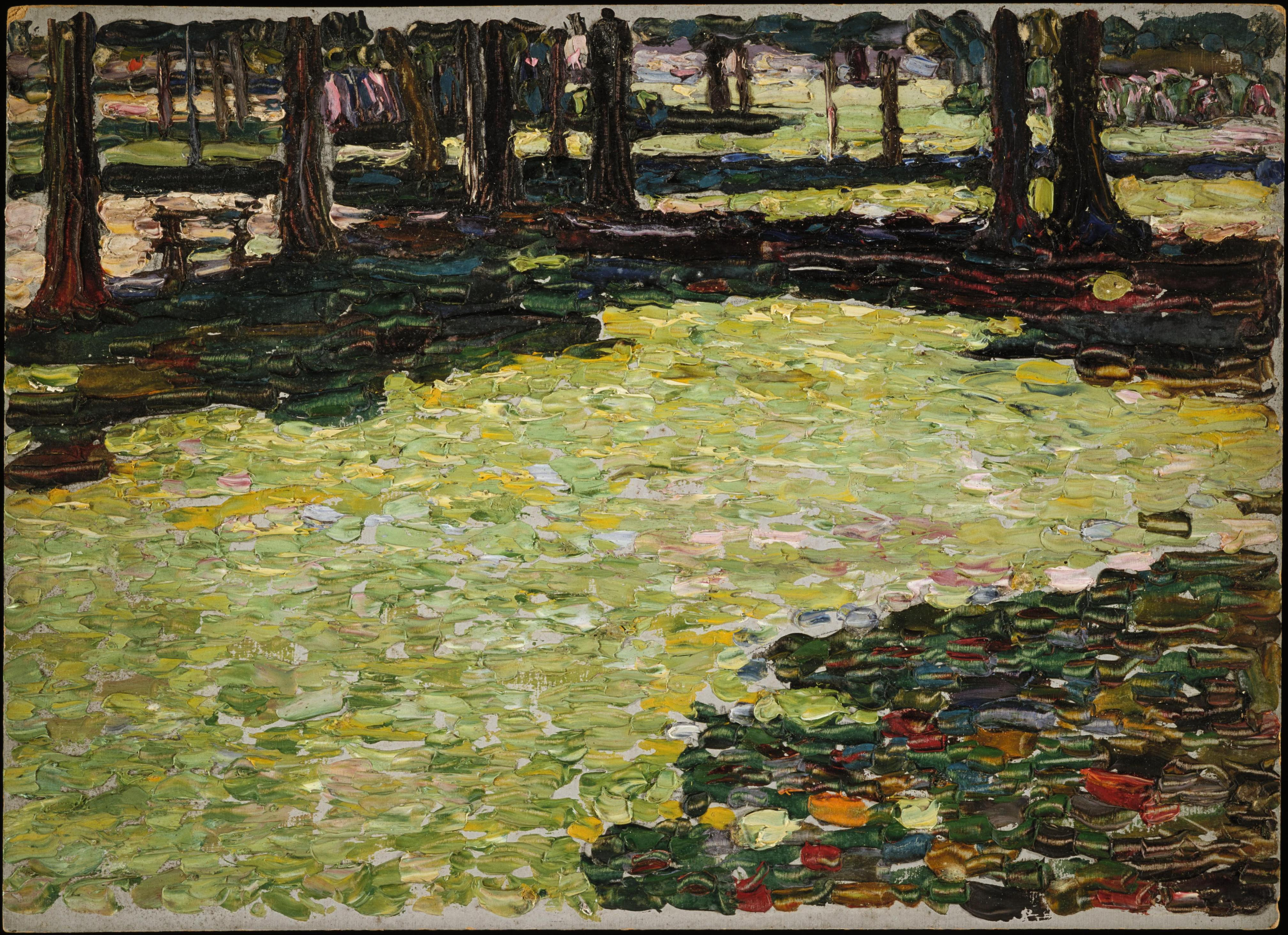
The park by Kandinsky, 1900s

Painter Wassily Kandinsky (1866–1944) painted a Parc de Saint-Cloud series in the early 20th century, before he became firmly associated with the abstract art movement.

== Buildings and points of interest ==
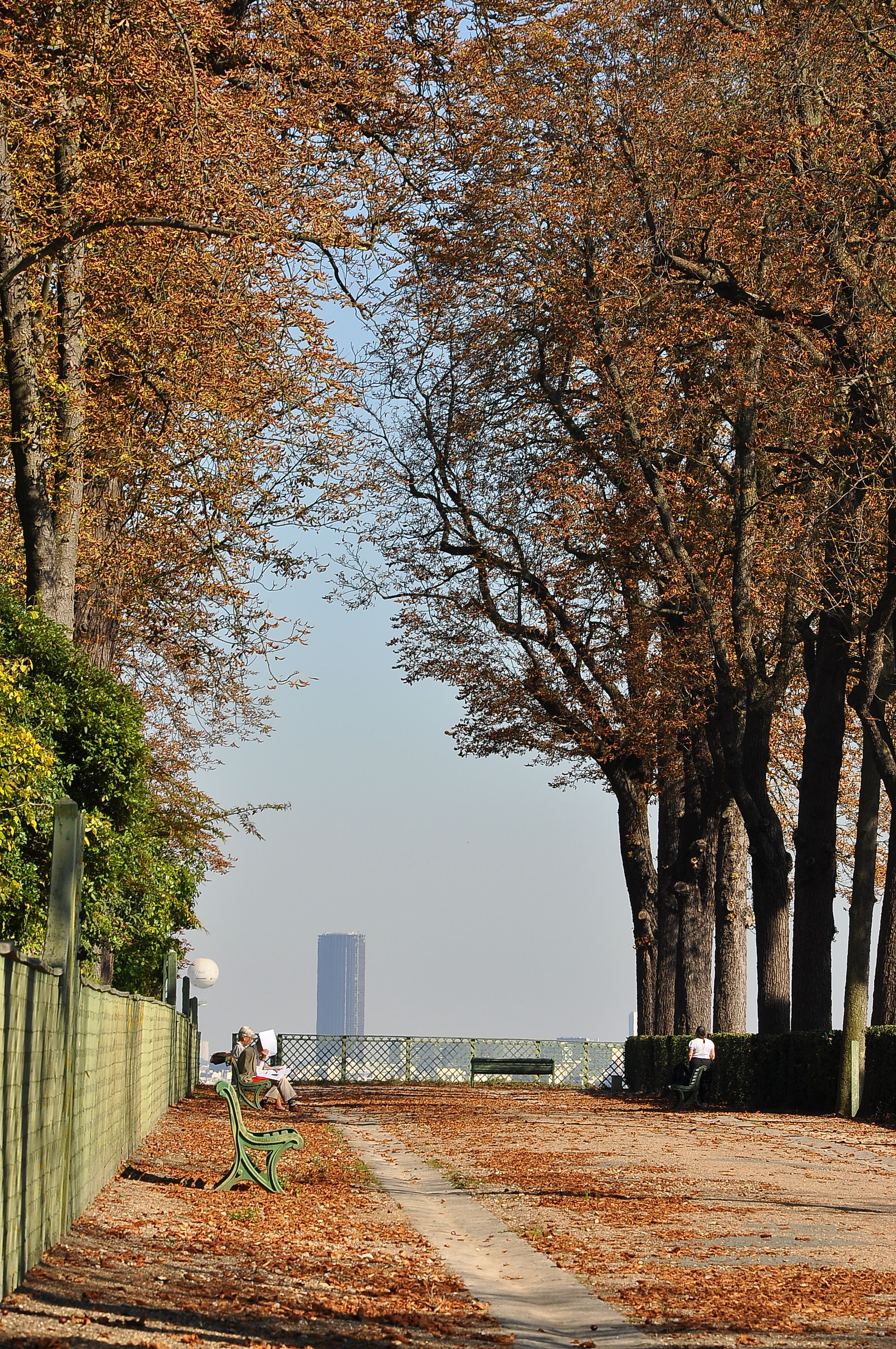
View of Tour Montparnasse from the park

- The Musée historique du château de Saint-Cloud: a five-room museum dedicated to the destroyed château
- The École Normale Supérieure (ENS): located in the Pavillon Valois
- The International Bureau of Weights and Measures (Bureau International des Poids et Mesures, BIPM): it has its headquarters in the Pavillon de Breteuil; the building contains copies of the metre and kilogramme standards.

== Public transport access ==
The park is accessible via Pont de Sèvres and Boulogne–Pont de Saint-Cloud station Paris Métro stations, on the right bank of the Seine. Île-de-France tramway Line 2 runs along the eastern limit of the park, with stops at Parc de Saint-Cloud and Musée de Sèvres.
