= 1787 in architecture =

The year 1787 in architecture involved some significant events in architectural history.

== Events ==
- The Hameau de Chantilly, a group of cottages, is constructed by Bathilde d'Orléans, Duchess of Bourbon, in the gardens of the Élysée Palace in Paris, in imitation of a village at the Château de Chantilly, her principal residence.
- The Royal Pavilion, at Brighton (England) is established as a seaside retreat for George, Prince of Wales. Extensive building work begins.

== Buildings and structures ==
=== Buildings completed ===
- United States:
  - Charleston, South Carolina: the Unitarian Universalist Church (a National Historic Landmark).
  - Bedford, New York: the Court House in Bedford Village (renovated in the 1960s), part of Bedford Village Historic District.
  - White Plains, New York: the second courthouse, built on the foundation of the first (1759) courthouse.
  - Philadelphia: the Morris House Hotel.
  - Jefferson County, Ohio: Fort Steuben, housing the first American Army Regiment.

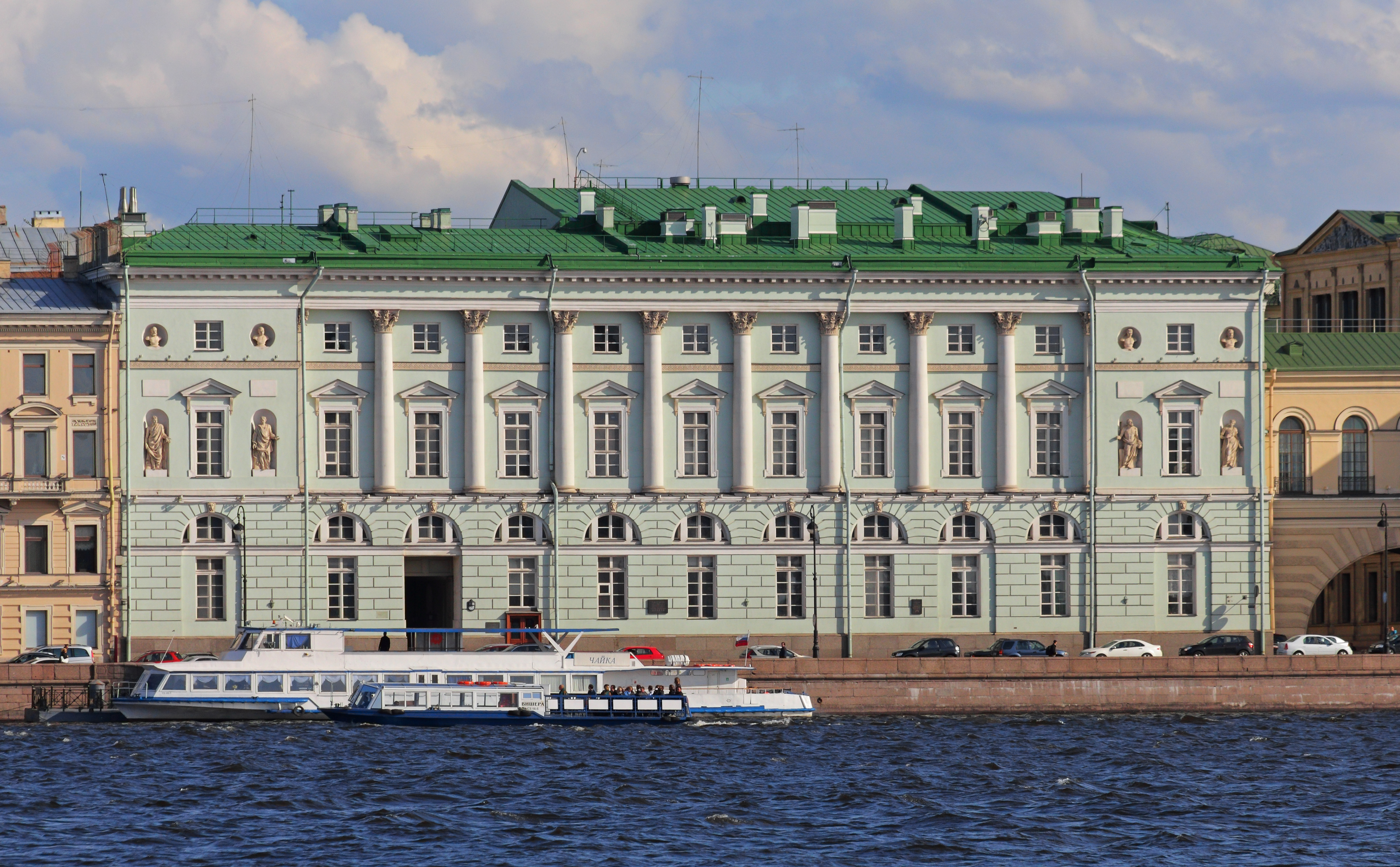
The Hermitage Theatre in Saint Petersburg, Russia

- The Hermitage Theatre, designed by Giacomo Quarenghi, in Saint Petersburg, Russia.
- The Museum of Natural History, later the Museo del Prado, in Madrid, Spain, designed by Juan de Villanueva (approximate date).
- Church of La Soledad, Mexico City, designed by Father Gregorio Pérez Cancio with the help of architects Cayetano de Sigüenza, Ildefonso Iniesta Bejarano, Francisco Antonio de Guerrero y Torres and Ignacio Castera.
- Al-Nabi Mosque, Qazvin (Persia), probably designed by Ustad Mirza Shirazi.
- Qingshui Temple in Taipei (Taiwan).
- Dome of the Sanctuary of Santa Maria della Vita, Bologna, Italy, designed by Giuseppe Tubertini.

=== Buildings opened ===
- October 14 – Theater auf der Wieden, designed by Andreas Zach, in suburban Vienna, Austria

== Births ==
- January 26 – Aleksandr Vitberg, Russian Neoclassical architect (died 1855)
- November 26 – Pascal Coste, French architect and engineer working in Egypt (died 1879)
- date unknown
  - Ignatius Bonomi, English architect (died 1870)
  - John Dobson, English architect (died 1865)
  - John Peter Gandy, English architect (died 1850)

== Deaths ==
- April 7 – Sir Nigel Gresley, 6th Baronet, builder of Sir Nigel Gresley's Canal (born c.1727)
- May 8 – Antonio Brianti, Italian architect (born 1739)
