= 1947 in architecture =

The year 1947 in architecture involved some significant events.

== Events ==
- February–June – Initial proposals for the Headquarters of the United Nations in New York City are drawn up.
- April – Initial proposals for Point Park Civic Center in Pittsburgh by Frank Lloyd Wright are presented.
- Bankside Power Station, London, designed by Sir Giles Gilbert Scott (completed in early 1960s; converted to Tate Modern art gallery in late 1990s).
- Le Corbusier commences construction of the Cité radieuse, Marseille.
- Reconstruction plan for the French city of Nantes by Michel Roux-Spitz is approved.
- Jože Plečnik proposes plans for the "Plečnik Parliament" overlooking Ljubljana.

== Buildings and structures ==
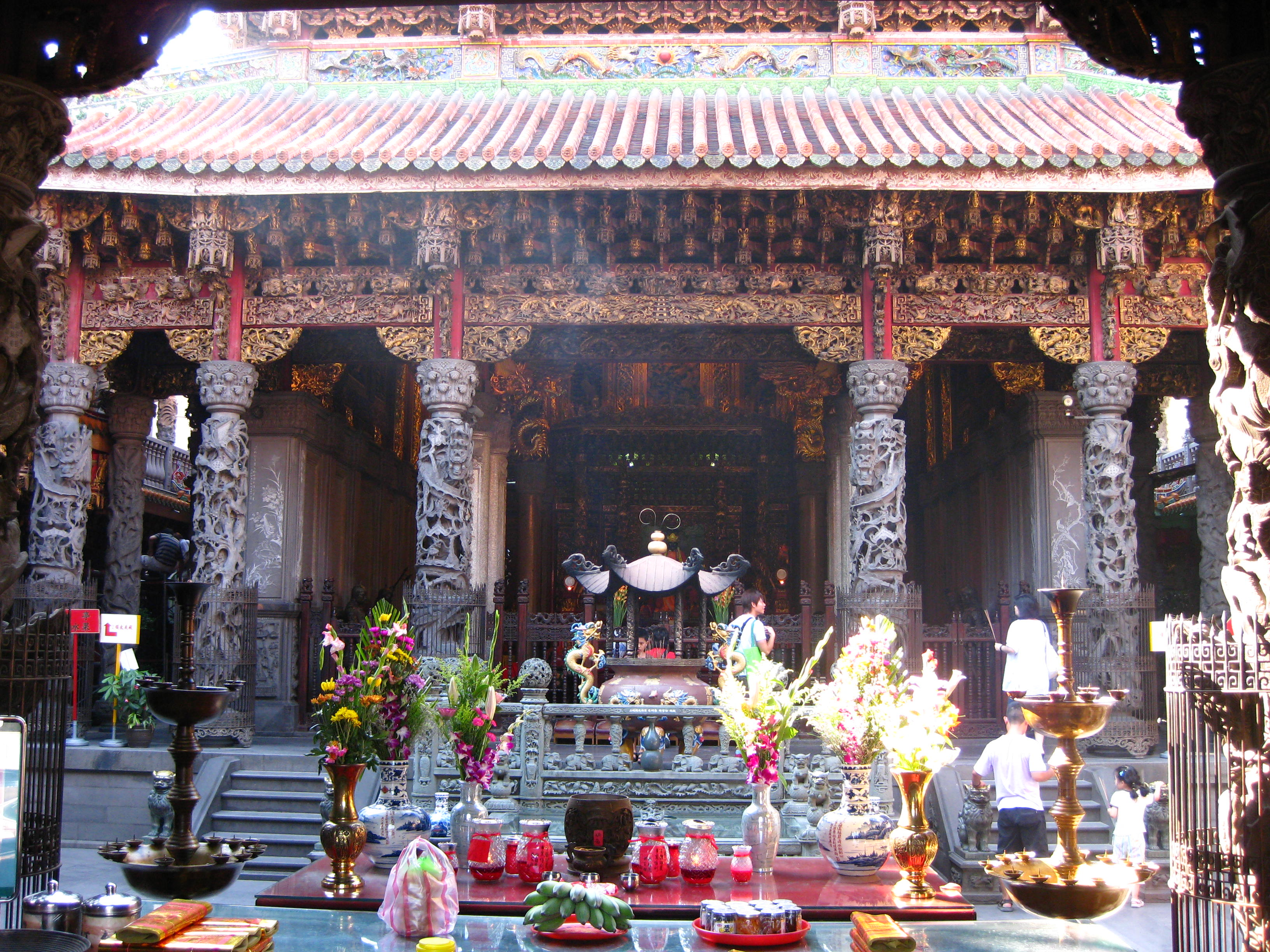
Zushi Temple, Taiwan

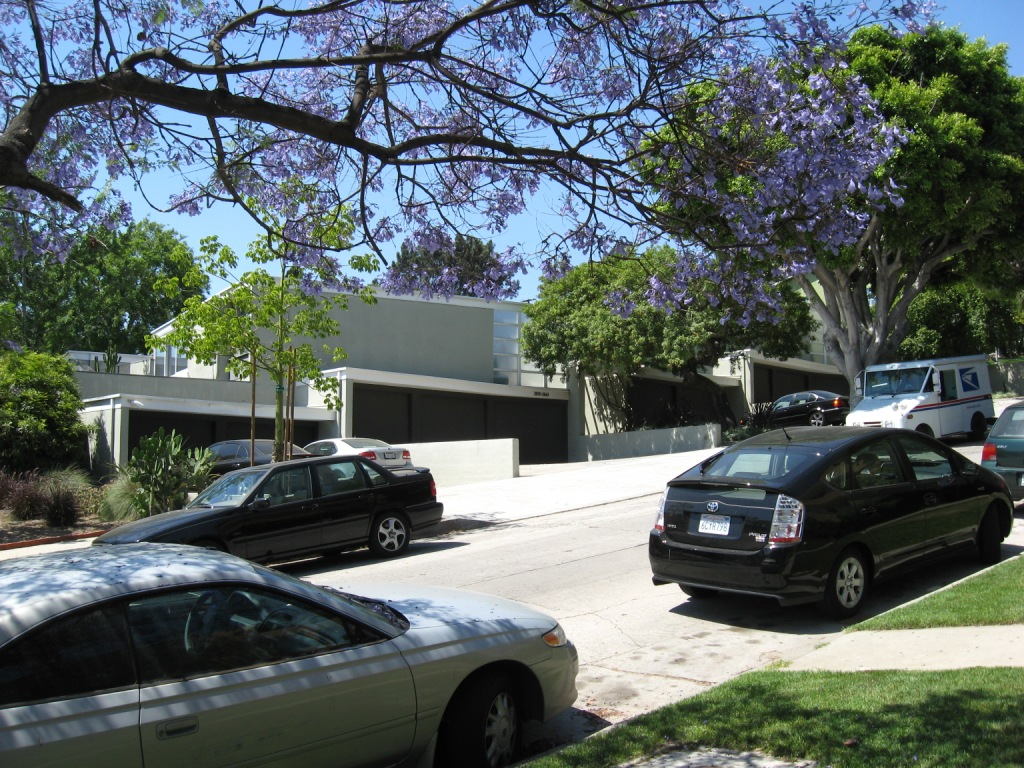
Avenel Cooperative Housing Project, Los Angeles

=== Buildings completed ===
- The Berkeley Building, or "Old" John Hancock Tower in Boston, Massachusetts, United States, designed by Cram and Ferguson.
- 75 Rockefeller Plaza in New York City.
- Altino Arantes Building in São Paulo, Brazil, designed by Plínio Botelho do Amaral with the contractors, Camargo & Mesquita.
- Wachovia Building (Mobile), Alabama, designed by Platt Roberts & Associates.
- Nizami Mausoleum, Ganja, Azerbaijan (replaced 1991).
- Cathedral of San Carlos de Bariloche, Argentina, designed by Alejandro Bustillo.
- St. Josaphat Cathedral, McCauley, Edmonton, Alberta, designed by Reverend Philip Ruh.
- Zushi Temple, New Taipei City, Taiwan, designed by Li Meishu.
- Avenel Cooperative Housing Project in Los Angeles, California, designed by Gregory Ain.
- Hearst Castle, California, designed by Julia Morgan (construction, begun in 1919, ceases).
- Delano hotel, Miami Beach, designed by Robert Swartburg.

== Awards ==
- AIA Gold Medal – Eliel Saarinen
- RIBA Royal Gold Medal – Albert Edward Richardson

== Births ==
- March 8 – Foad Rafii, Iranian architect working in Canada
- March 22 – George Ferguson, English architect and politician working in Bristol
- April 20 – Mark Fisher, English architect specialising in rock music stage sets (died 2013)
- June 24 – Ian Ritchie, English architect working internationally
- November 10 – Patrick Berger, French architect
- December 9 – Steven Holl, American architect
- December 12 – Will Alsop, English architect (died 2018)
- December 21 – Jacques Lucan, French architect
- Aykut Karaman, Turkish architect

== Deaths ==
- January 22 – Max Berg, German architect (born 1870)
- February 21 – Richard Barry Parker, English architect and urban planner (born 1867)
- April 1 – Carl Krayl, German architect (born 1890)
- June 6 – José Marques da Silva, Portuguese architect (born 1869)
- August 5 – Charles Bateman, English architect (born 1863)
- September 9 – Victor Horta, Belgian architect (born 1861)
- October 1 – James Gamble Rogers, American architect (born 1867)
- November 5 – Fritz Schumacher, German architect (born 1869)
- November 20 – Walter J. Mathews, American architect working in California (born 1850)
- November 28
  - James Miller, Scottish architect (born 1860)
  - Cecil Wood, New Zealand architect (born 1878)
- Vjekoslav Bastl, Croatian secessionist architect working in Zagreb (born 1872)
- Frank Chouteau Brown, American architect (born 1876)
- Henrietta Cuttino Dozier, American architect working in the southern states (born 1872)
- Squire J. Vickers, American architect working on the New York City Subway (born 1872)
- Francis W. Wilson, American architect working in California (born 1870)
