= 1929 in architecture =

The year 1929 in architecture involved some significant architectural events and new buildings.

== Events ==
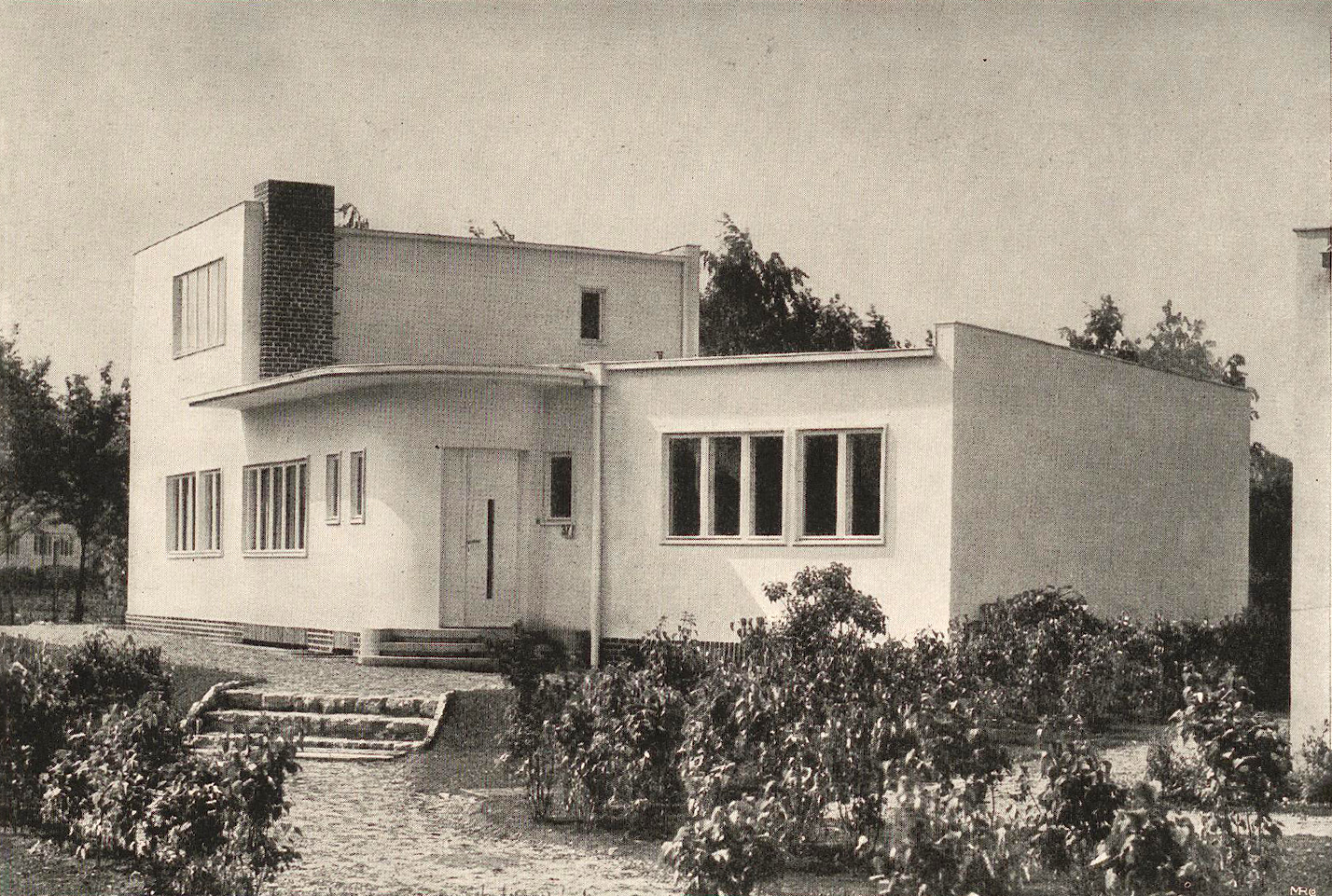
Wohnungs- und Werkraumausstellung, Breslau

- September 7 – Ceremony to lay the foundation stone for the new Palace of Nations in Geneva.
- November 18 – Ceremony to break the ground for the Umaid Bhawan Palace in Jodhpur, India, designed by Henry Vaughan Lanchester (completed 1943).
- Plan of White City (Tel Aviv) in Mandatory Palestine by Patrick Geddes agreed.
- WUWA (Wrocław)

== Buildings and structures ==
=== Buildings opened ===
- April – Williamsburgh Savings Bank Tower, Brooklyn, New York city, designed by Halsey, McCormack and Helmer.
- July 11 – Chapel, Stowe School, England, designed by Sir Robert Lorimer (died September 13).
- July 23 – Landakotskirkja, Reykjavik, Iceland.
- August 24 – Baker City Tower hotel, Baker City, Oregon, designed by Tourtellotte & Hummel.
- October 3 – Dominion Theatre, London, England, designed by W. and T. R. Milburn.
- December 1 – Underground Electric Railways Company of London headquarters, 55 Broadway, designed by Charles Holden.

=== Buildings completed ===
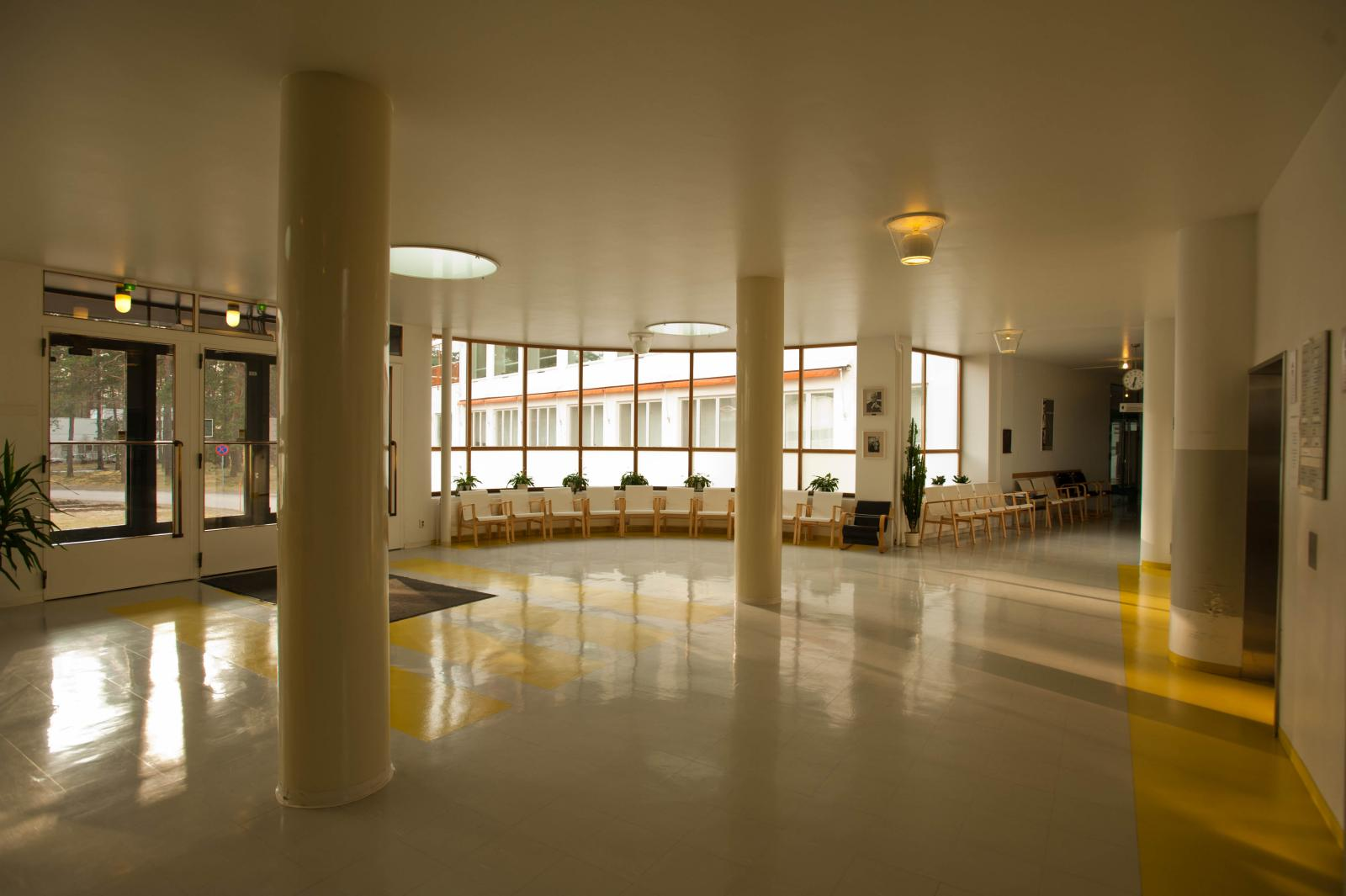
Paimio Sanatorium in Finland

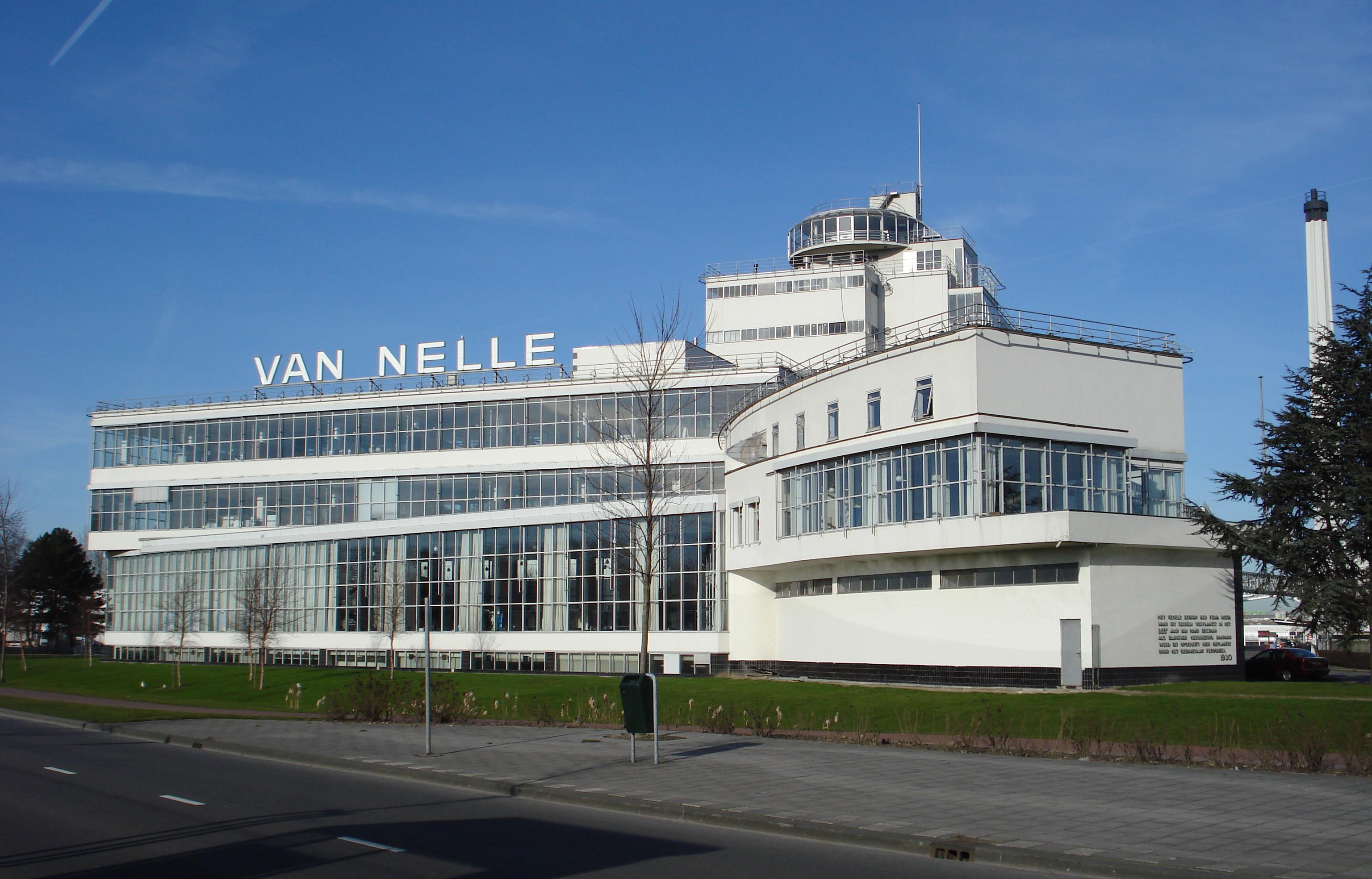
Van Nelle Factory, Rotterdam, Holland

- Station reconstructions on Berlin U-Bahn, designed by Alfred Grenander.
- The Barcelona Pavilion, designed by Ludwig Mies van der Rohe.
- Royal York Hotel in Toronto, Ontario; it becomes the tallest building in the British Empire.
- Frauenfriedenskirche, Frankfurt, Germany.
- Church of Our Lady & St Alphege, Bath, England, designed by Giles Gilbert Scott (July).
- Lovell House in Los Angeles, designed by Richard Neutra.
- E-1027 vacation home at Roquebrune-Cap-Martin in the south of France, designed for themselves by Eileen Gray and her lover Jean Badovici.
- Imperial Chemical House on Millbank, Westminster, London, designed by Frank Baines.
- Paimio Sanatorium in Finland, designed by Alvar Aalto.
- Boston Avenue Methodist Church in Tulsa, Oklahoma.
- Richfield Tower in Los Angeles, designed by Stiles O. Clements.
- Van Nelle Factory in Rotterdam, Netherlands.
- Plaza de Toros de Las Ventas in Madrid, Spain, designed by José Espeliú.
- Melnikov-House, designed by Konstantin Melnikov.
- Rodmarton Manor in Gloucestershire, England, designed by the Barnsley brothers and Norman Jewson (begun 1909).
- Functionalist villa by Bohdan Lachert in Warsaw, Poland.

== Awards ==
- AIA Gold Medal – Milton Bennett Medary
- RIBA Royal Gold Medal – Victor Laloux
- Grand Prix de Rome, architecture – Jean Niermans

== Births ==
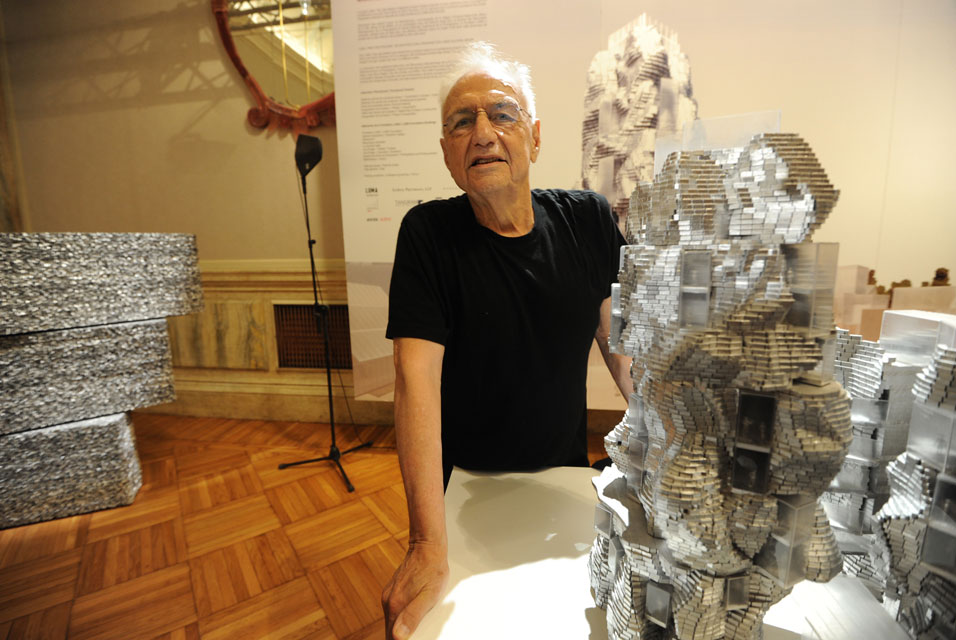
Frank Gehry

- January 11 – Dmitri Bruns, Estonian architect and theorist (died 2020)
- February 28 – Frank Gehry, Canadian-American Pritzker Prize-winning architect (died 2025)
- April 3 – Fazlur Rahman Khan, Bengal-born structural engineer (died 1982)
- May 22 – Neave Brown, American-born British residential architect (died 2018)
- June 15 – Derek Walker, English architect and urban planner (died 2015)
- July 13 – Richard Vyškovský, Czech architect and creator of paper models (died 2019)
- October 11 – Raymond Moriyama, Canadian architect (died 2023)

== Deaths ==
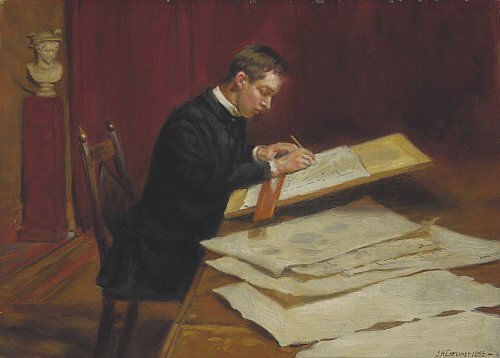
Robert Lorimer

- January 25 – Ralph Knott, English architect (born 1878)
- February 24 – Lucien Weissenburger, French Art Nouveau architect (born 1860)
- April 4 – Francis Conroy Sullivan, Canadian architect and pupil of Frank Lloyd Wright (born 1882)
- August 27 – James Knox Taylor, Supervising Architect of the United States Department of the Treasury (born 1857)
- September 13 – Sir Robert Lorimer, Scottish architect and furniture designer (born 1864)
- October 15 – Émile Bénard, French architect and painter (born 1844)
- December 10 – Axel Berg, prize-winning Danish architect (born 1856)
