= 1739 in architecture =

== Buildings and structures ==
=== Buildings ===
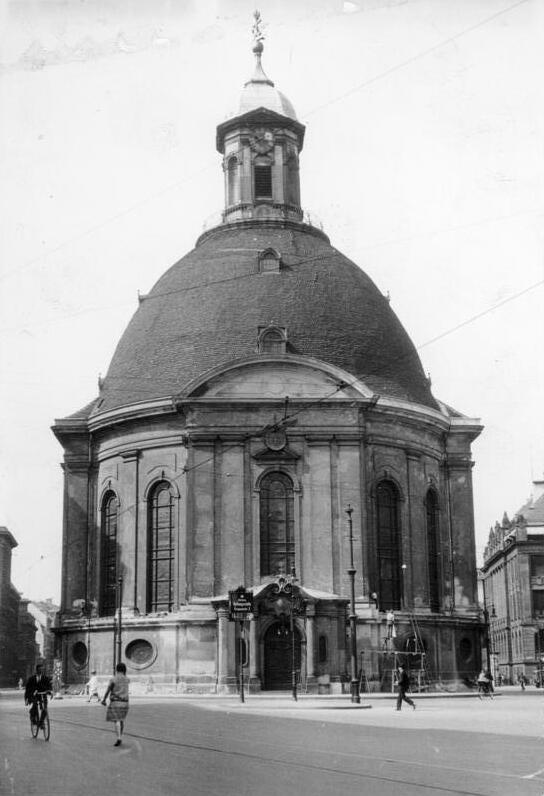
Holy Trinity Church (Berlin)

- Holy Trinity Church (Berlin), designed by Christian August Naumann, completed.
- Church of Santa Felicita, Florence, rebuilt by Ferdinando Ruggieri, completed.
- Church of Saint Ildefonso, Porto, Portugal, inaugurated.
- New Room, Bristol, England (Wesleyan Methodist chapel).
- Amalienburg, Munich, Bavaria, designed by François de Cuvilliés, completed.
- Schloss Meseberg, Germany.
- Prinz-Albrecht-Palais, Berlin, completed.
- Crowcombe Court, Somerset, England, designed by Thomas Parker, completed.
- Old Colony House, Newport, Rhode Island, designed by Richard Munday.
- Frescati House, Blackrock, Dublin, Ireland.
- Nahar Singh Mahal, Ballabhgarh, India (approximate date).
- Catherine Canal, Saint Petersburg, dug.

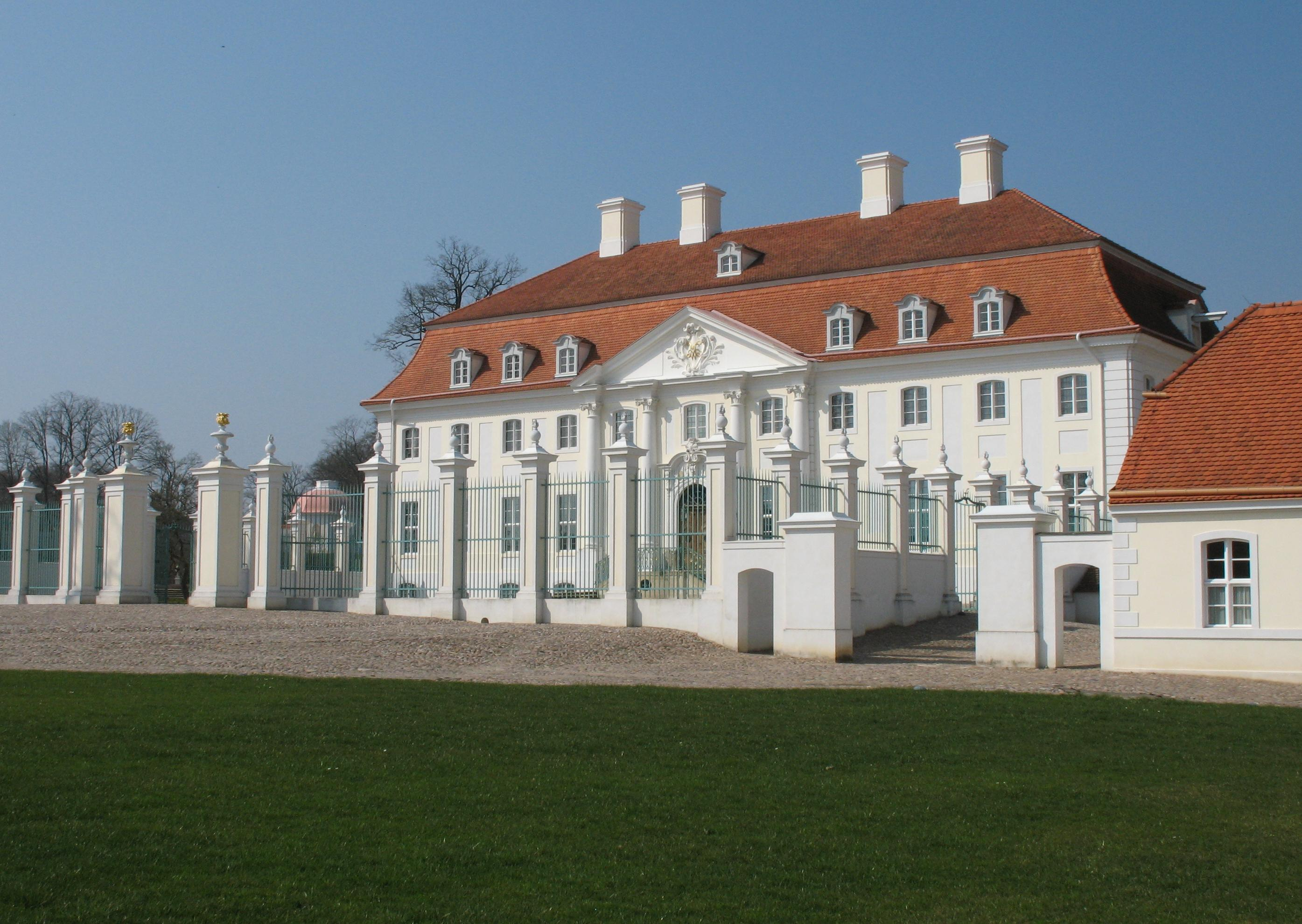
Schloss Meseberg

== Births ==
- January 19 – Joseph Bonomi the Elder, Italian architect working in England (died 1808)
- February 15 – Alexandre-Théodore Brongniart, French architect (died 1813)
- September 15 – Juan de Villanueva, Spanish architect (died 1811)
- date unknown – Antonio Cachia, Maltese architect, civil and military engineer and archaeologist (died 1813)

== Deaths ==
- May 10 – Cosmas Damian Asam, German painter and architect (born 1686)
- Richard Munday, American colonial architect (born c.1685)
