= 1860 in architecture =

The year 1860 in architecture involved some significant architectural events and new buildings.

== Events ==
- August 22 – The Cenotaph to Matthew Henry, designed by Thomas Harrison, is unveiled in Chester, England.

== Buildings and structures ==
=== Buildings opened ===
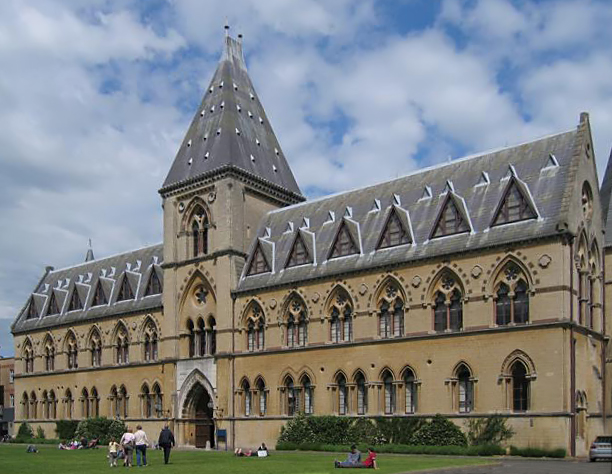
Oxford University Museum of Natural History

- Spring – Willden Fort, Utah, built by Charles William Willden and his son Ellott (no longer standing).
- June – Oxford University Museum of Natural History, designed by Benjamin Woodward.
- August 28 – St. Augustin, Coburg (Bavaria), consecrated by the Archbishop of Bamberg Michael Deinlein.
- November 22 – Solund Church, Norway, designed by Christian Henrik Grosch, consecrated by Bishop Jens Matthias Pram Kaurin.
- November 28 – Swedish Theatre, Helsinki, Finland, designed by Georg Theodor von Chiewitz.

=== Buildings completed ===
- Mosque of Omar, Bethlehem, Palestinian territories.
- Varshavsky railway station building in Saint Petersburg, Russia, designed by Piotr Salmanovich.
- Armour–Stiner House in Irvington, New York.

== Awards ==
- RIBA Royal Gold Medal – Sydney Smirke

== Births ==
- March 11 – Thomas Hastings, American architect (died 1929)
- May 2 – Lucien Weissenburger, French Art Nouveau architect (died 1929)
- August 20 – Kirtland Cutter, American architect (died 1939)
- date unknown – James Miller, Scottish commercial architect based in Glasgow (died 1947)
- date unknown – Bertie Crewe, English architect (died 1937)

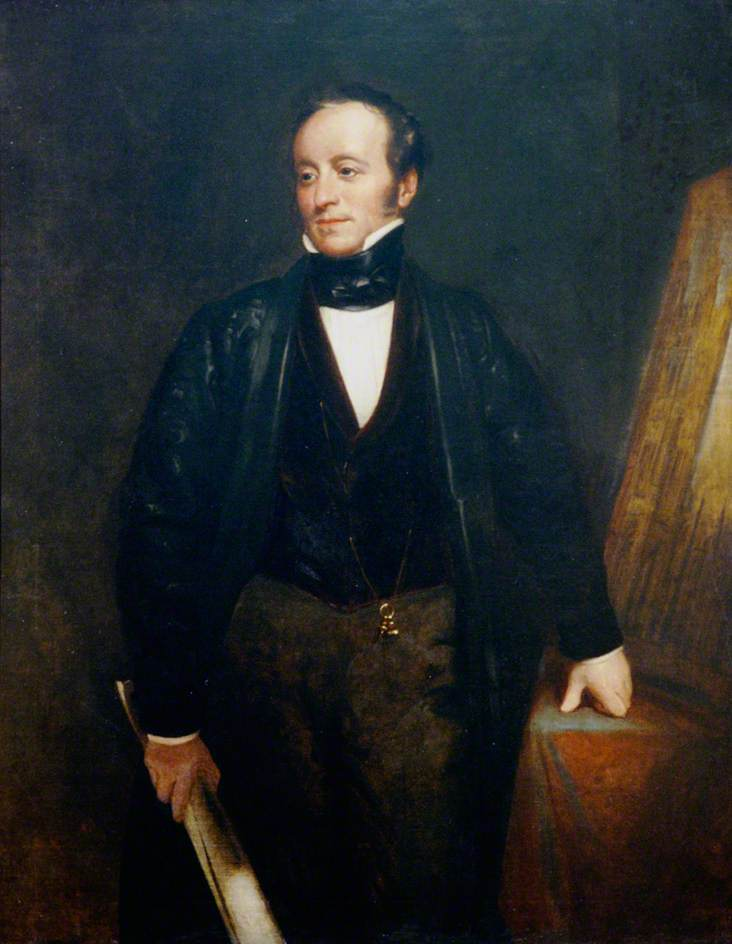
Charles Barry

== Deaths ==
- February 1 – Giacomo Moraglia, Milanese neoclassical architect (born 1791)
- February 19 – Edward Lapidge, English architect (born 1779)
- March 6 – Joseph Welland, Irish architect (born 1798)
- April 19 – Karol Podczaszyński, Polish neoclassical architect (born 1790)
- May 12 – Charles Barry, English architect best known for his role in the rebuilding of the Palace of Westminster (born 1795)
- October 10 – Thomas Larkins Walker, British-born architect (born 1811)
