= 1878 in architecture =

The year 1878 in architecture involved some significant events.

== Buildings and structures ==
=== Buildings ===
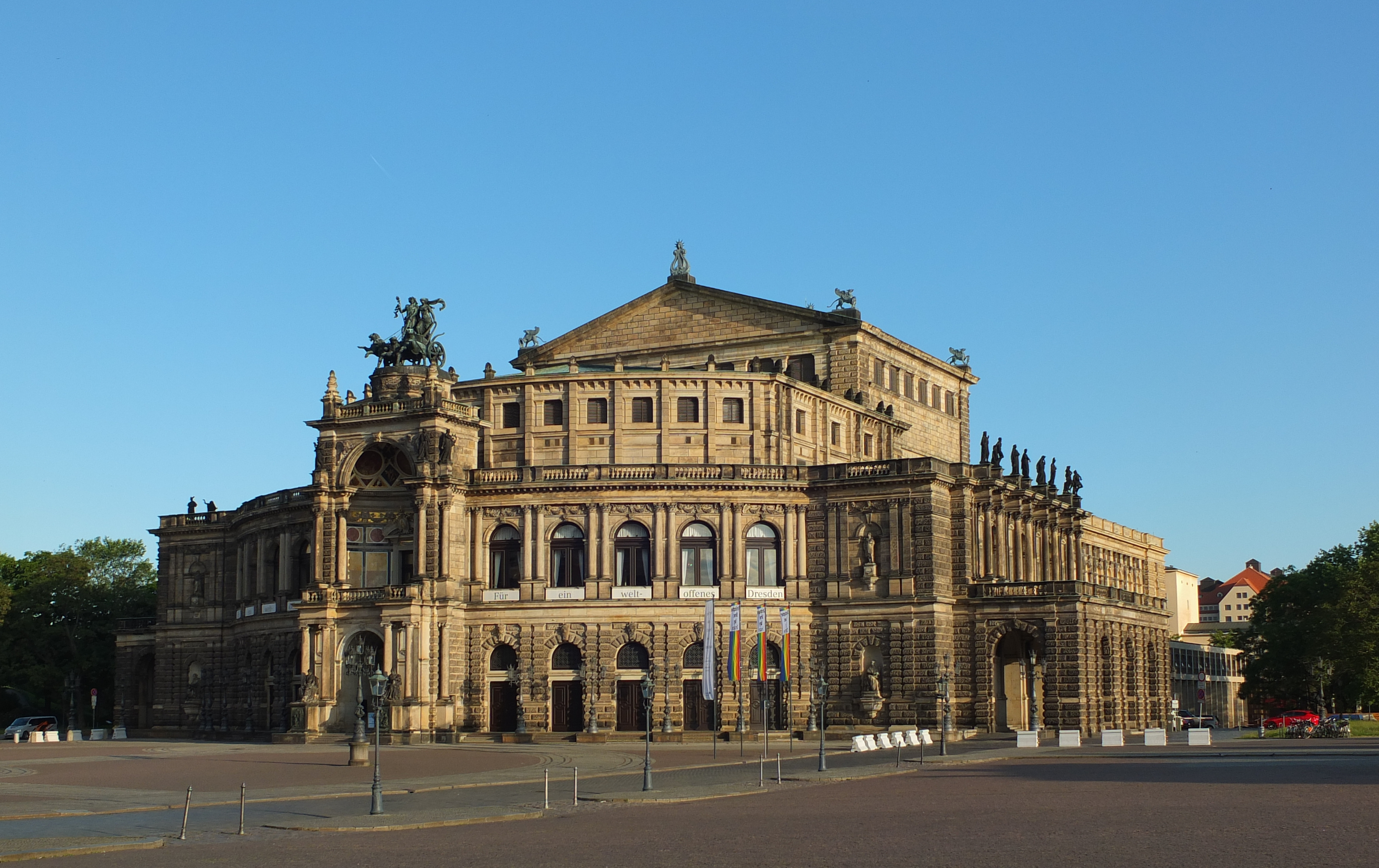
Semperoper in Dresden, Germany

- Work begins on the Herrenchiemsee in Bavaria, designed by Georg Dollman.
- The Semperoper in Dresden, designed by Gottfried Semper, is completed.
- The Tower House, Kensington, designed by William Burges for himself, is completed.
- The White House and No. 1 Tite Street, Chelsea, London, designed by Edward William Godwin, are completed.
- The Michigan State Capitol in Lansing, Michigan is completed.
- Construction begins on the Indiana Statehouse Indianapolis, Indiana
- Rajabai Clock Tower in South Mumbai, India is opened.

== Awards ==
- RIBA Royal Gold Medal – Alfred Waterhouse.
- Grand Prix de Rome, architecture: Victor Laloux.

== Developments ==
- Thaddeus Hyatt introduces a patent for reinforced concrete to the United States.

== Births ==
- May 3 – Ralph Knott, English architect (died 1929)
- May 21 – Arthur Joseph Davis, English Beaux-Arts architect and interior designer (died 1951)
- June 24 – James Chapman-Taylor, New Zealand Arts and Crafts domestic architect (died 1958)
- September 29 – Mārtiņš Nukša, Latvian architect and diplomat (executed 1942)
- Violet Morris, English architect (died 1958)

== Deaths ==
- March 27 – Sir George Gilbert Scott, English Gothic Revival architect (born 1811)
