= 1865 in architecture =

The year 1865 in architecture involved some significant architectural events and new buildings.

== Events ==
- George Gilbert Scott wins the competition to design the St Pancras railway station hotel and buildings in London.

== Buildings and structures ==
=== Buildings completed ===
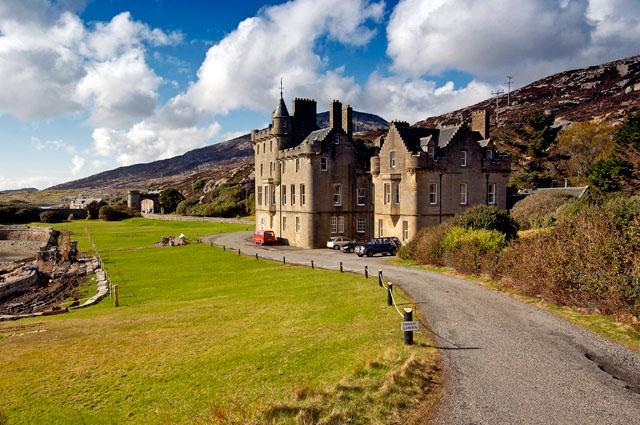
Amhuinnsuidhe Castle

- Amhuinnsuidhe Castle, Harris, Scotland, built for Charles Murray, 7th Earl of Dunmore, by David Bryce. In 2003 Amhuinnsuidhe Castle Estate purchases the castle (and its fishing rights).
- Cefn Coed Viaduct, Wales, designed by Alexander Sutherland and Henry Conybeare.
- Government House, Brisbane, Australia, designed by Benjamin Backhouse.
- Bataclan theatre in Paris, designed by Charles Duval.
- Iron-framed shipping warehouses at Saint-Ouen in Paris, designed by engineer Hippolyte Fontaine.
- Crossness Pumping Station, serving the London sewage system, designed by engineer Joseph Bazalgette and architect Charles Henry Driver.
- Westminster Chapel, London, designed by W. F. Poulton.
- Stowford and Magnolia Cottages, Stowford, Cheshire, England, designed by William Eden Nesfield.

== Awards ==
- RIBA Royal Gold Medal – James Pennethorne.
- Grand Prix de Rome, architecture: Jules Machard, André Hennebicq, Gustave Huberti.

== Births ==
- April 27 – Archibald Leitch, Scottish architect, designer of football stadia (died 1939)
- September 20 – William Weir, Scottish-born conservation architect (died 1950)
- October 23 – Baillie Scott, British architect (died 1945)
- November 17 – Paul Charbonnier, French architect (died 1953)
- date unknown
  - Józef Gosławski, Polish architect (died 1904)
  - Philip Mainwaring Johnston, English architect (died 1936)

== Deaths ==
- January 8 – John Dobson, English neoclassical architect (born 1787)
- June 8 – Joseph Paxton, English gardener, architect and Member of Parliament, best known for The Crystal Palace (born 1803)
- December 4 – Francis Fowke, British engineer and architect (born 1823)
- December 23 – Alan Stevenson, Scottish lighthouse engineer (born 1807)
