= 1811 in architecture =

The year 1811 in architecture involved some significant events.

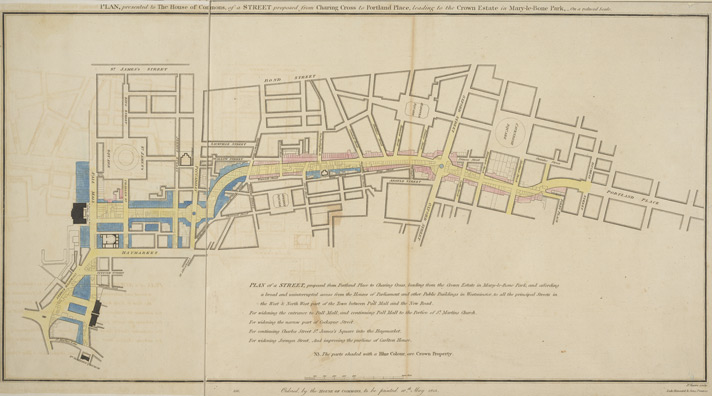
John Nash's plan for Regent Street, London

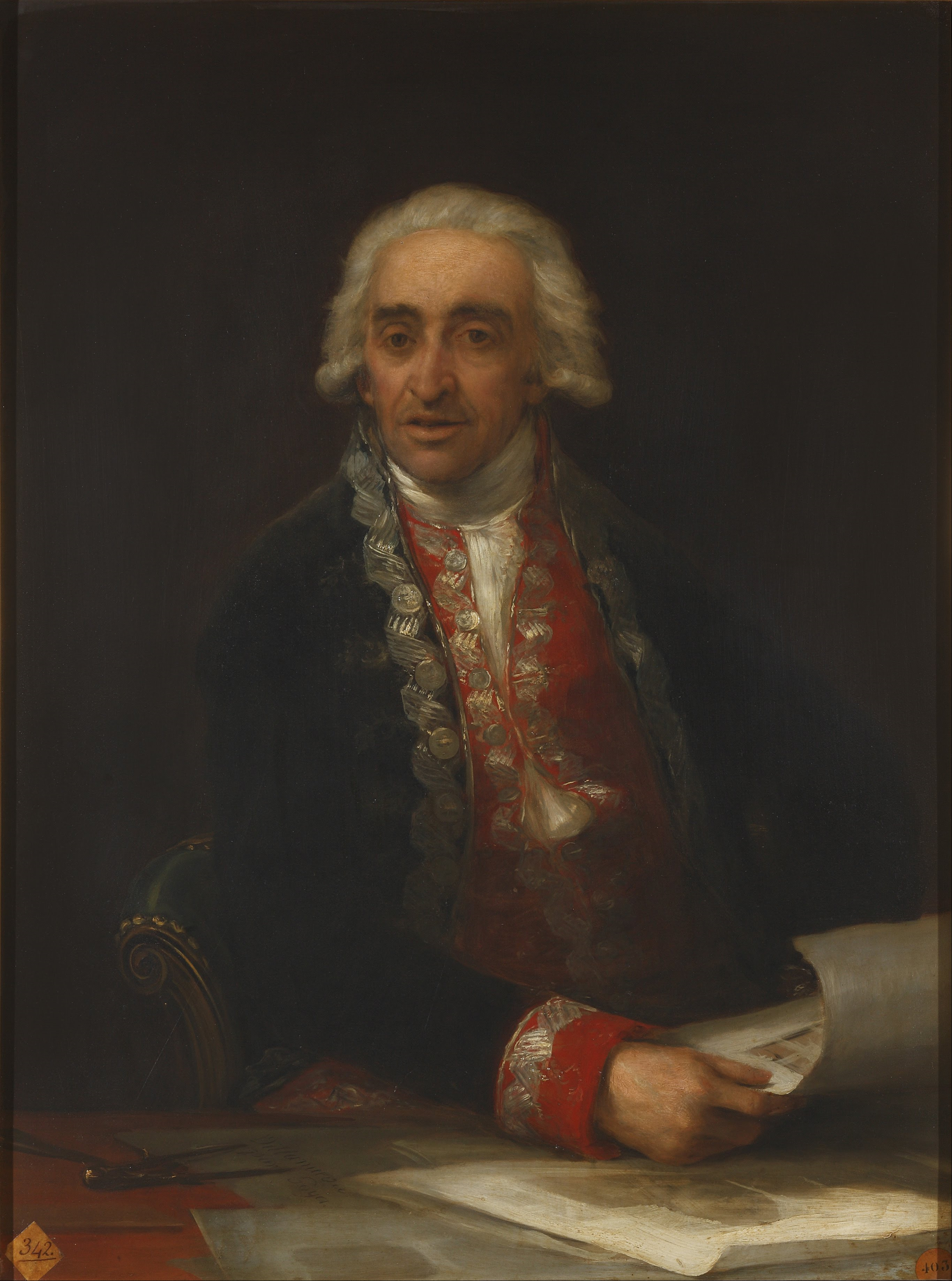
Juan de Villanueva painted by Goya

== Buildings ==
- Argyll House, London, designed by William Wilkins is completed
- The House wing of the United States Capitol, designed by William Thornton and Benjamin Latrobe is completed.

== Events ==
- March – The Commissioners' Plan of 1811 determines the grid plan of Manhattan.
- John Nash prepares his plan of the Regent Street and Regent's Park areas of London.

== Awards ==
- Grand Prix de Rome, architecture: Jean-Louis Provost.

== Births ==
- c. May – Thomas Larkins Walker, British architect (died 1860)
- July 13 – George Gilbert Scott, English architect (died 1878)

== Deaths ==
- May 5 – Robert Mylne, British architect (born 1734)
- August 22 – Juan de Villanueva, Spanish architect (born 1739)
