= 1813 in architecture =

The year 1813 in architecture involved some significant events.

== Buildings and structures ==
=== Buildings ===
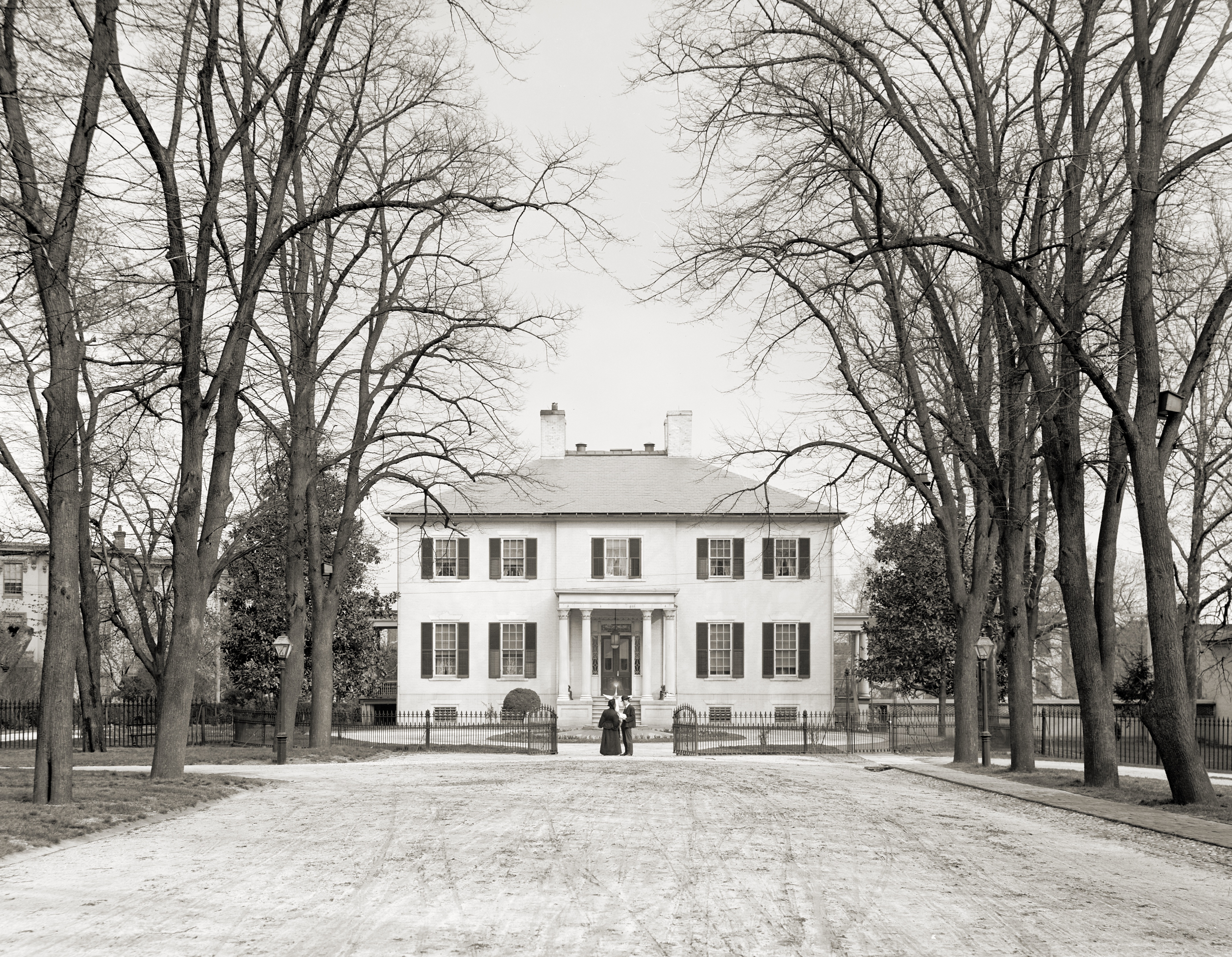
Executive Mansion (Virginia) photographed in 1905

- The Theatre Royal, Plymouth, England, designed by John Foulston, is opened.
- 3 Abbey Road, London (later a recording studio)
- Executive Mansion, Richmond, Virginia, official residence of the governor of Virginia in the United States, designed by Alexander Parris, is completed
- Palacio de Mineria in Mexico City, designed by Manuel Tolsá, is completed.
- Façade of Milan Cathedral, designed by Pellicani, is completed.

== Awards ==
- Grand Prix de Rome, architecture: Auguste Caristie

== Births ==
- January 6 – Charles Lanyon, English architect associated with Belfast (died 1889)
- February 23 – Ferdinand Stadler, Swiss architect (died 1870)
- July 21 – Jakub Bursa, Czech architect, folk artist and builder (died 1884)
- December 6 – August Sicard von Sicardsburg, Austrian architect (died 1868)
- date unknown – John Skipton Mulvany, Irish architect (died 1870)

== Deaths ==
- June 6
  - Alexandre-Théodore Brongniart, French architect (born 1739)
  - Antonio Cachia, Maltese architect, civil and military engineer and archaeologist (born 1739)
- date unknown – Michael Searles, English Regency commercial architect (born 1750)
