= 1870 in architecture =

The year 1870 in architecture involved some significant architectural events and new buildings.

== Buildings and structures ==
=== Buildings ===
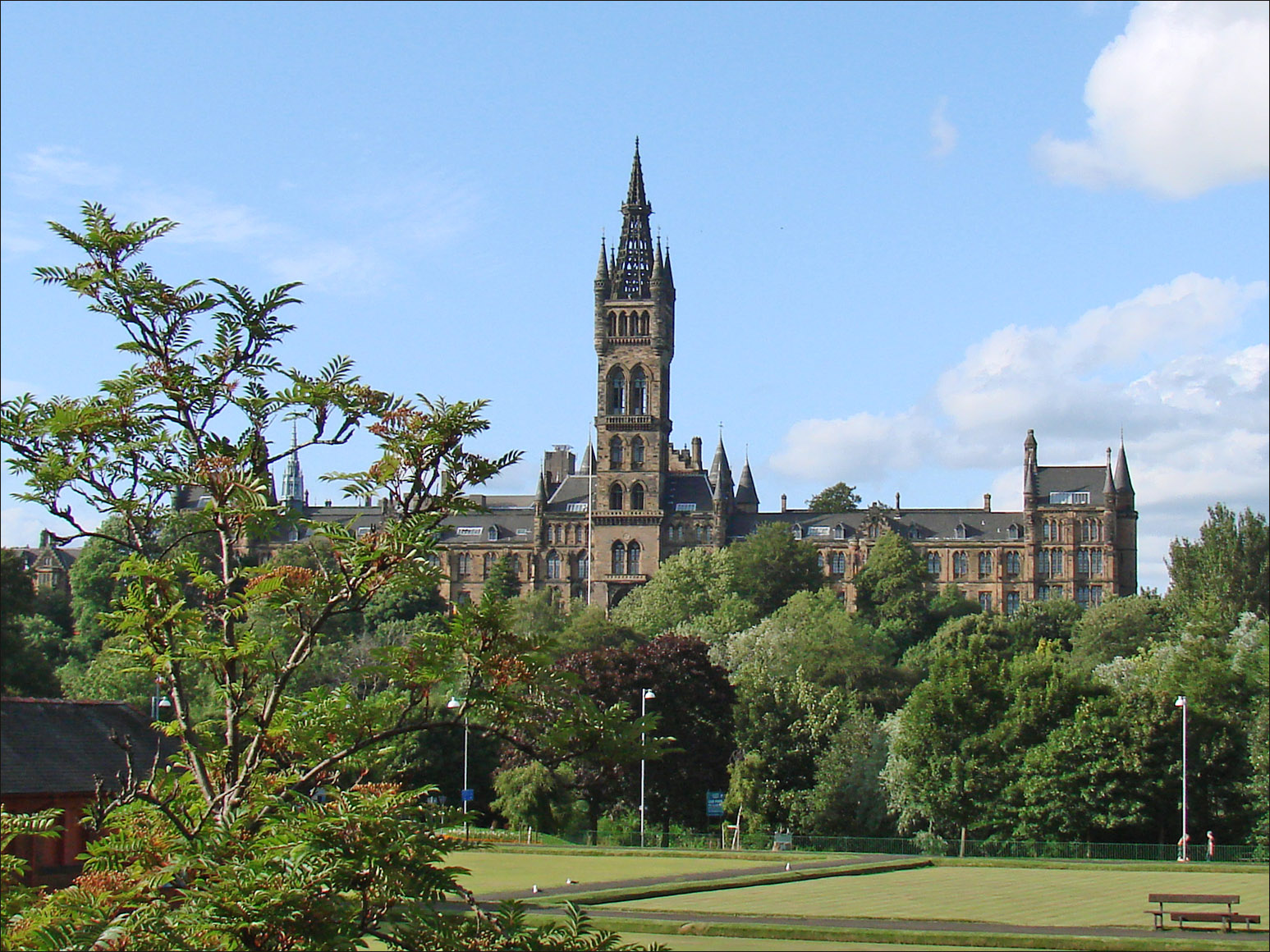
University of Glasgow

- January 6 – The Musikverein in Vienna, designed by Theophil Hansen, is inaugurated.
- May 1 – Equitable Life Building (New York City), designed by Arthur Gilman and Edward H. Kendall, with George B. Post as a consulting engineer, is completed. The 7-storey building is the first office block to incorporate passenger elevators, hydraulic examples by the Elisha Otis company.
- June 23 – Keble College, Oxford, designed by William Butterfield, is opened.
- August 9 – Melbourne Town Hall, Melbourne, Australia is opened.
- November – University of Glasgow new campus building, designed by George Gilbert Scott, is opened.
- All Saints' Church, Cambridge, England, designed by George Frederick Bodley, is completed.
- Perth Town Hall in Australia, designed by Richard Roach Jewell and James Manning, is completed.
- David Sassoon Library in Bombay, designed by J. Campbell and G. E. Gosling, is completed.
- Khotan Mosque in China is built.
- Approximate date – Les Halles markets in Paris, designed by Victor Baltard, completed.

== Awards ==
- RIBA Royal Gold Medal – Benjamin Ferrey.
- Grand Prix de Rome, architecture: Albert-Félix-Théophile Thomas.

== Births ==
- April 17 – Max Berg, German architect and urban planner (died 1947)
- November 18 – P. Morley Horder, English architect (died 1944)
- December 10 – Adolf Loos, Austrian-Czech Modernist architect (died 1933).
- December 15 – Josef Hoffmann, Austrian architect and designer (died 1965)

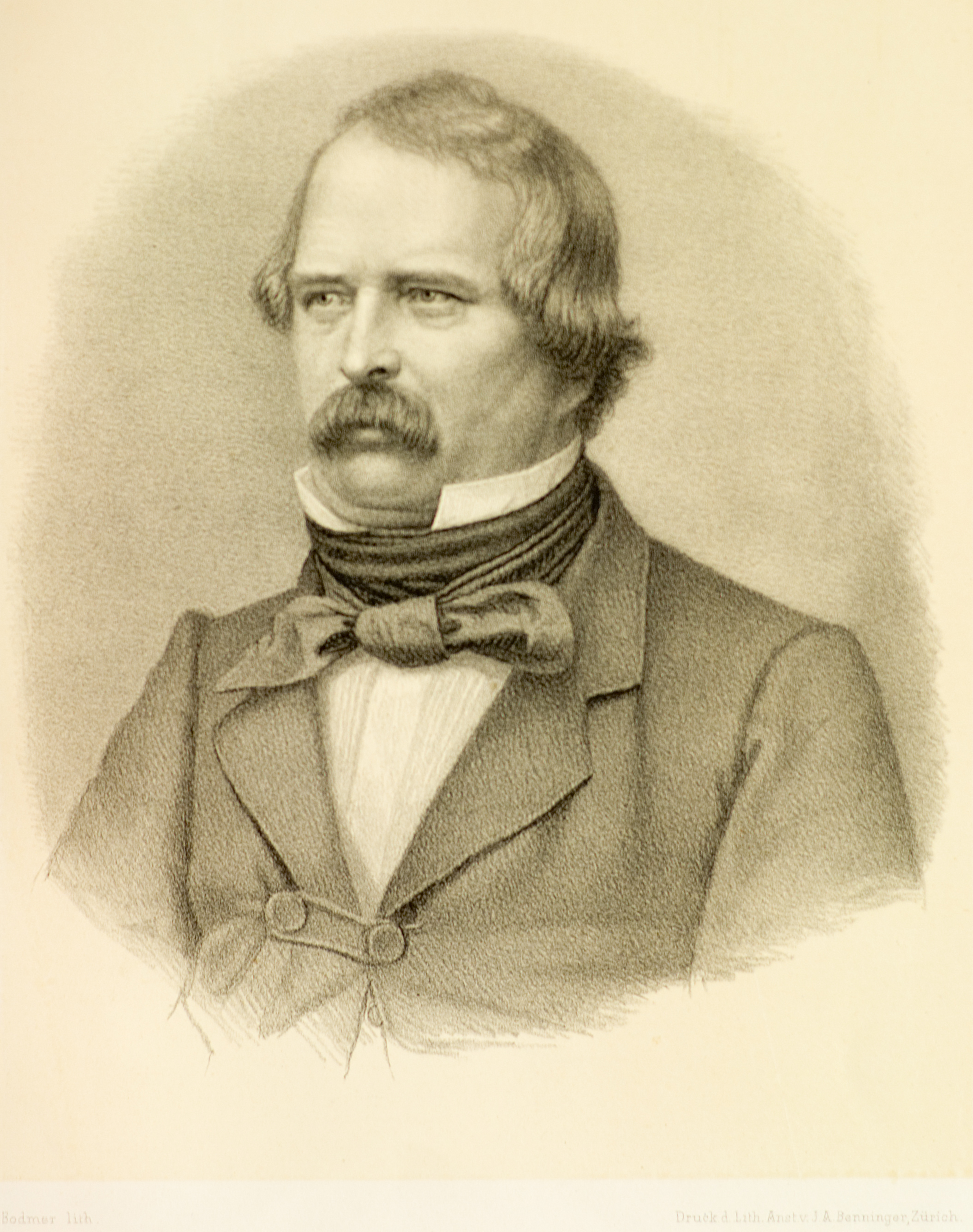
Ferdinand Stadler

== Deaths ==
- January 2 – Ignatius Bonomi, English architect and surveyor (born 1787)
- February 15 – William Burn, pioneer of the Scottish Baronial style (born 1789)
- March 24 – Ferdinand Stadler, Swiss architect (born 1813)
- c. May – John Skipton Mulvany, Irish architect (born 1813)
- October 8 – Félix Duban, French architect (born 1798)
- December 28 – Philip Hardwick, English architect particularly associated with railway stations and warehouses in London (born 1792)
