= Emil Sutor =

German sculptor

Olympic medal record

Art competitions
Gold medal – first place	1936 Berlin	Reliefs

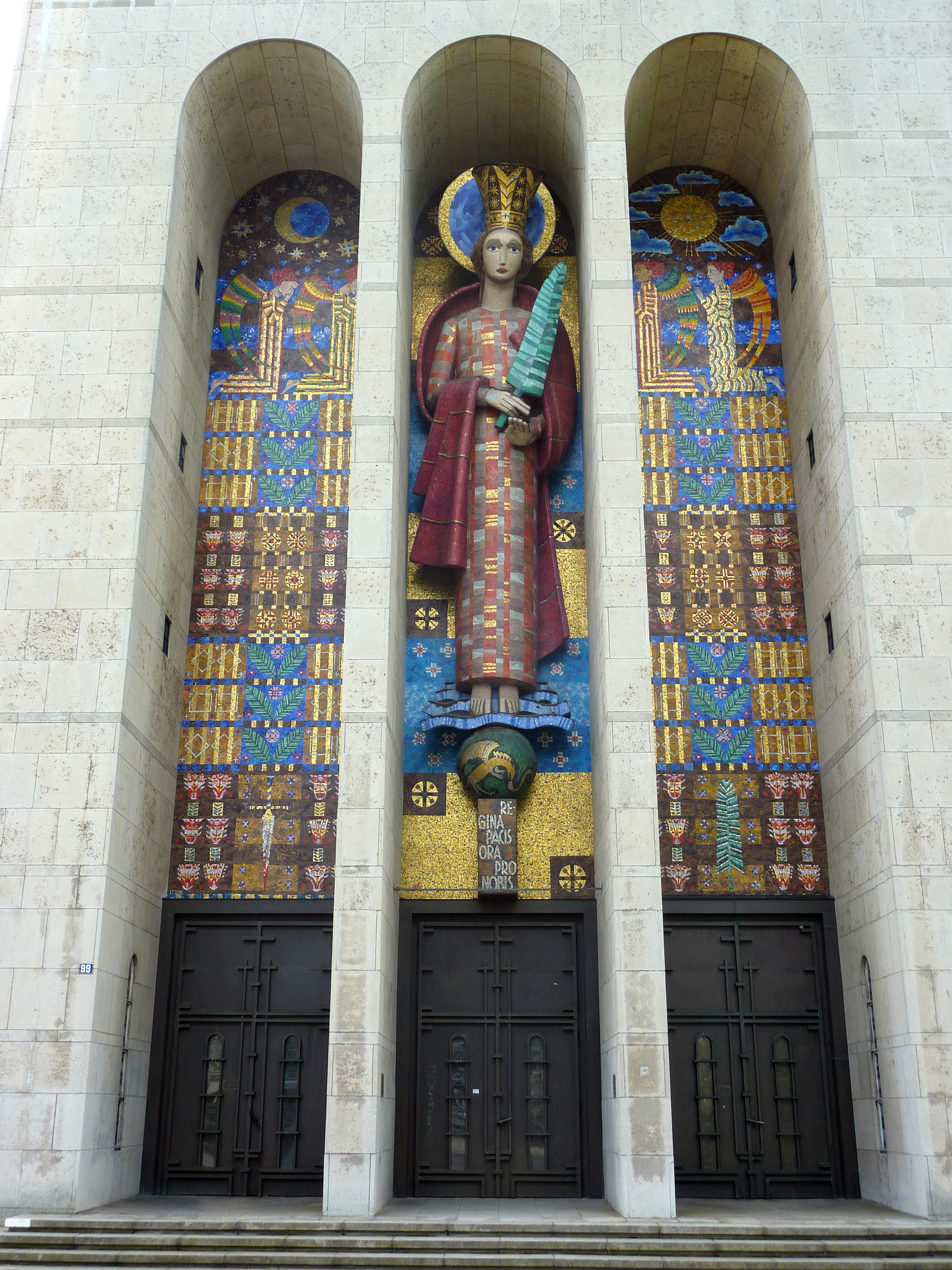
portal of the Frauenfriedenskirche, Bockenheim (Frankfurt am Main), circa 1927

Emil Sutor (June 19, 1888 – August 13, 1974) was a German sculptor. He was born in Offenburg and died in Karlsruhe. In 1936 he won a gold medal in the art competitions of the Olympic Games for his "Hürdenläufer" ("Hurdle runners").
