= Christian August Naumann =

German architect

Christian August Naumann (1705 – 1766) was a German architect.

Naumann's designs included the Luisenstädtische Kirche and Holy Trinity Church, both in Berlin, Kingdom of Prussia. Neither building is standing today.

== Sources ==
Erich Donnert. Unbekannte Quellen, Aufsätze zu Entwicklung, Vorstufen, Grenzen und Fortwirken der Frühneuzeit in und um Europa, Inhaltsverzeichnisse der Bände 1 - 6, Personenregister der Bände 1 - 7: Festschrift für Günter Mühlpfordt [zum 85. Geburtstag]. Böhlau Verlag Köln Weimar; 2008 [cited October 14, 2012]. German. ISBN 978-3-412-10702-4. p. 482.
