= Mārtiņš Nukša =

Latvian diplomat and architect

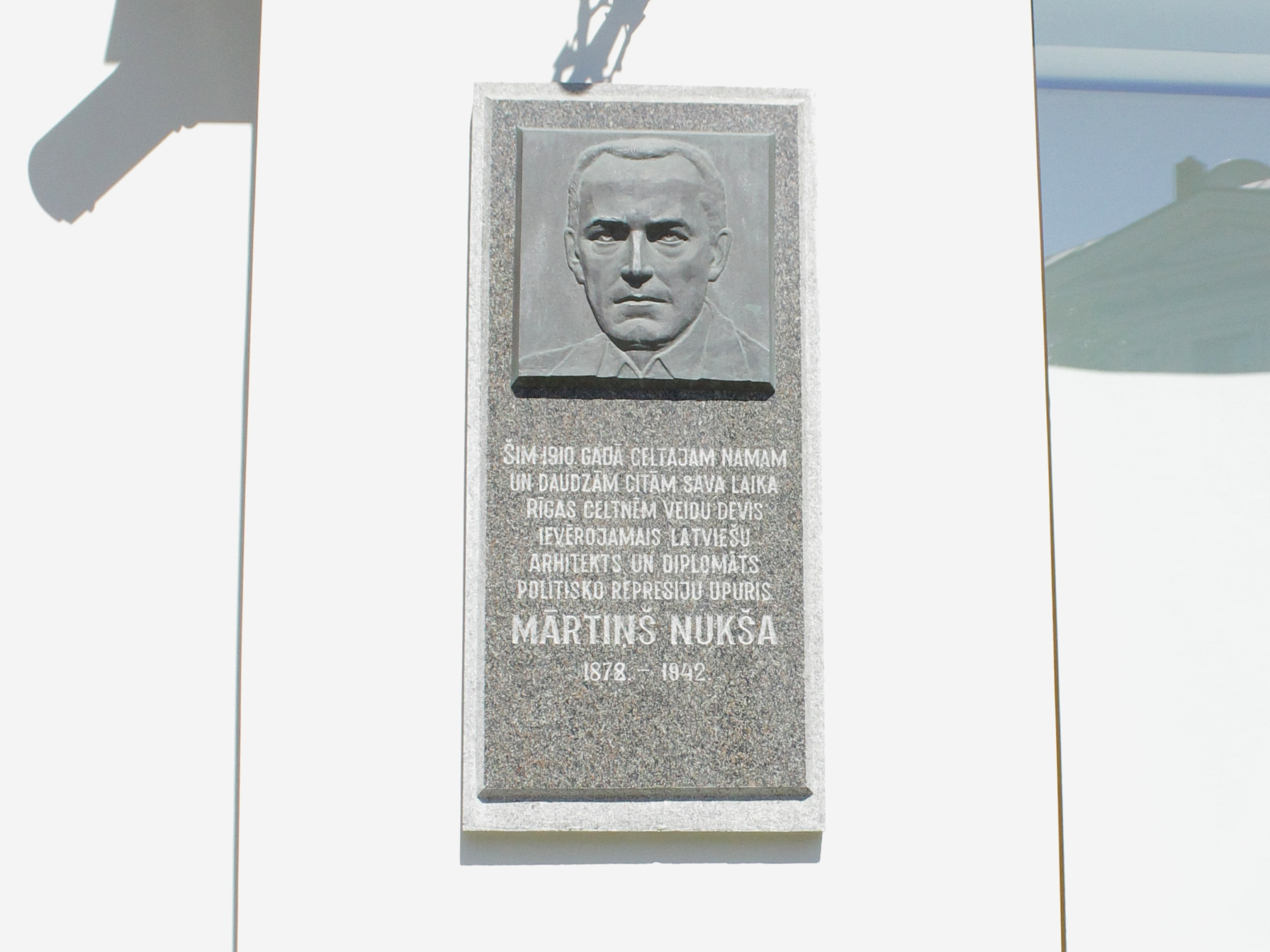
A plaque in Riga commemorating Mārtiņš Nukša

Mārtiņš Nukša (29 September 1878 – 17 May 1942) was a Latvian diplomat and architect. He worked as an architect in Riga during the heyday of Art Nouveau architecture and from 1920 as a diplomat representing Latvia. He was arrested by Soviet authorities after the occupation of Latvia and executed in 1942.

== Biography ==
Mārtiņš Nukša was born in Vidriži parish in present-day Latvia (at the time part of the Russian Empire). He studied architecture between 1900 and 1908 at the Riga Polytechnic Institute (present-day Riga Technical University), and immediately after finishing his studies set up his own architectural firm in Riga. He also studied law abroad. During his career as an architect in Riga, he designed about 20 multi-storey apartment buildings in the city, most of them in Art Nouveau style. In 1915, he was working with railway construction in Moscow. Between 1916 and 1918 he was the City Architect of Sevastopol, and in 1919 he was appointed as assistant City Architect of Marseille, France.

From 1920 he worked as a diplomat for his newly independent homeland Latvia. His first assignment was in France. In 1921, he was appointed as ambassador to Poland, in 1922 to Romania and in 1925 to Austria, maintaining residence in Warsaw. In March 1930, he was appointed as ambassador to Sweden, Denmark and Norway with residence in Stockholm, but already in August the same year was transferred to Prague, where he worked as ambassador for Latvia to Czechoslovakia and Yugoslavia. In 1934, he was also again as ambassador to Romania (with continued residence in Prague). In 1939, he became secretary general at the Ministry of Foreign Affairs. In addition to serving as a diplomat, he was engaged in charities and civil society organisations. He was a member of the Latvian Farmers' Union from 1933.

On 13 August 1940 he was arrested in Riga by Soviet authorities, during the first Soviet occupation of Latvia. He was released on 18 August. Following the occupation, he naturally lost his job at the ministry (which in effect ceased to exist). From January 1941 he once more worked as an architect, employed by the Soviet authorities. He was however arrested again on 14 June 1941 and sent to a prison in Solikamsk. Among the charges directed against him were accusations that he was "bourgeois" and a "kulak", as well as the claim that he was supporting monarchy. His work as a diplomat representing his native country and the fact that he had been a member of a political party were used as evidence against him. He was convicted and shot to death by the Soviet authorities in Solikamsk on 17 May 1942. The Latvian Soviet Socialist Republic Supreme Court Criminal Case Panel annulled the criminal case on 23 August 1988.

His wife, Marija Luīza Sostena, and son, Andris Jānis, emigrated to France in 1941.

== Honours and awards ==
- Order of the Three Stars (Latvia)
- Order of St. Olav (Norway)
- Order of Polonia Restituta (Poland)
- Order of the Crown (Romania)
- Order of the Polar Star (Sweden)
