= Richard Vyškovský =

Czech architect (1929–2019)

Richard Vyškovský (13 July 1929 – 1 August 2019) was a Czech architect and creator of paper models.

In 1960s Vyškovský worked for the State institute for reconstruction of historic towns and monuments (SÚRPMO) in Prague. After a discussion with colleagues, complaining about the limited availability of die-cast Matchbox scale cars sold in the Czechoslovakia only in Tuzex shops, he decided to create similar models from paper. His first model was designed after a die-cast Packard Landaulet model manufactured by Lesney Products under code Y-11 in the series Models of Yesteryear. In October 1968 the newspaper Lidová demokracie published a short article about "ing. Blecha and his colleague" accompanied by photos of paper models Mercedes 38/220 and Packard Landaulet.

The state-owned publishing house SNDK and Vladislav Toman, editor in chief of ABC magazine, showed interest in publishing paper models by Blecha/Vyškovský. Already in 1968 SNDK published their paper diorama "Hussite siege of Karlštejn". ABC Magazine published a simplified paper model of a Packard Landaulet in March 1969. In the following seven years Blecha and Vyškovský published in ABC and SNDK/Albatros a series of further paper models, including a vast model of Prague Castle. From 1976 Vyškovský designed the models for ABC and Albatros on his own. The first published self model was Formula 1 Ferrari 312-T2 of Niki Lauda for ABC. Since 1997 his models have also been published by the company ERKOtyp, which is co-owned by his son Richard.

== Books with paper models ==
- Vyškovský, Richard (2004). Velká kniha vystřihovánek ABC: městská památková rezervace [The great book of paper models from ABC magazine: Urban architectural reserve] (in Czech). Prague: BB/art, Ringier ČR. 447 pages. ISBN 80-7341-353-1.
- Vyškovský, Richard (2007). Zlatá kniha vystřihovánek arch. Richarda Vyškovského: 35 vystřihovánek z časopisu ABC a novinka Hrad Točník [Golden book of papermodels by Richard Vyškovský: 35 papermodels from ABC magazine and Castle Točník] (in Czech). Prague: BB/art in cooperation with Ringier ČR. 395 pages. ISBN 978-80-7381-102-0.
