= Aykut Karaman =

Professor Aykut Karaman (born 1947) is a Turkish architect and professor of urbanism at the Mimar Sinan Fine Arts University in Istanbul.

== Biography ==
Karaman was born in 1947 in Eşme, Turkey.

He received a degree in architecture from Mimar Sinan Fine Arts University before moving to study and complete his PhD at the University of Pennsylvania, department of architecture where he specialised in urban design.

=== Teaching and academic positions, publications ===
- Professor of Urbanism. Mimar Sinan Güzel Sanatlar University: MSGSÜ (Mimar Sinan Fine Arts University), Faculty of Architecture, Department of City and Regional Planning, Istanbul.
- Graduate Program: Theories and Principles of Urban Design, U.D. Studio, Urban Morphology, Behavioral Factors in Urban Design, Cases and Models of Urban Regeneration, Ecological Design.
- City Planning Undergraduate Program: IV. Year Planning Studio, Sustainable Development Planning and Design.
- Architectural Undergraduate Program: Architecture and Urban Design Studio.
- Director of Research and Implementation Center of Urbanism, Chaired City and Regional Planning Department and Urban Design Program.

His publications are on theories and cases of urban design, urban regeneration, socio-cultural aspects of mass housing design, historical urban landscape ecological design and urban morphology.

== Work ==
=== Restoration works ===
- Akşehir. Umit Aslim Karaman House Restoration. II. Group Listed Heritage (2004)
- Istanbul, Zeyrek. Zenbilli Ali Efendi House Restoration. II. Group Listed Heritage (2000)

=== Architectural concept designs ===
- Milas, Oren Municipality Building (2007)
- Istanbul, Tepecik-Tepekent AR –EL Education Campus (2003)
- Istanbul, Tepecik- Tepekent Club. Tepekent, Istanbul (2000)
- Istanbul, Esenkent High School (1996)
- Istanbul, Esenyurt, Esenkent Cultural Center (1996)
- Aksehir Municipality Building (1989)

UrbanRenewal and Conservation Plans

- Site Management Plan of Aphrodisias Antic City 2012
- Conservation Principles for Aphrodisias Antik City-Geyre, Turkey (2005)
- The Conservation Master Plan for the Fatih District of Istanbul and Urban Design for the Zeyrek District of Istanbul with Prof. Dr. U. Serdaroğlu in Emre Ltd. (1992–1993)

=== Master Plans ===
- Master Plan for Istanbul Kucukcekmece Koyici. Prepared for Istanbul Metropolitan Municipality (2005)
- Master Plan for the Second phase of Bahçeşehir (Garden City) of a new Town Development on the Fringe of Istanbul. (1/5000, 1/1000)

=== Urban Design Projects ===
- Rijswijk Zuid Urban Design Concept Project’s Team Member. ISoCaRP, UPAT (Urban Planning Advisory Team, formerly UTF) and Rijswijk Municipality’s Mission (2007)
- Russia, Yeroslaws Riverside Development.13000 Units Preliminary Project (2007)
- Russia, Yeroslav Single Family Housing Design, 300 units. Preliminary Project (2007)
- Istanbul Kucukcekmece, Ayazma 5000 Units Housing Development UD Concept Project (2005)
- Istanbul, Tepecik, Tepekent 2000 Unit Suburban Neighborhood Design (1996)
- Yoncaköy Neighborhood Design, 1200 single- and multiple-family units, Büyükyoncalı. Preliminary Project (1997)
- Erguvan Kent Neighborhood Design, 450 single-family units, Çatalca. Preliminary Project (1997)
- Bahçeşehir Bogazkoy Neighborhood Design, 6000 single- and multiple-family units, Bahçeşehir, Istanbul (1993–1995)
- Istanbul, Ağaçlı Rekreational Park. Concept Project (1992)
- Esenkent Neighborhood Design, 7200 single- and multiple-family units, for low-income groups, Istanbul (1989–1993)

== Awards ==
- Second Prize: Istanbul Tarlabaşı District Design Guideline Competition
- Second Prize: Istanbul Şişli Culture and Commercial Center International Competition. (with Sümer Gürel)
- First Mention: Istanbul, Üsküdar Square International Competition
- Second Prize: Akşehir Nasrettin Hodja Cultural Centre Competition
