= Holy Trinity Church, Berlin =

Baroque Protestant church in Berlin

Trinity Church
- Dreifaltigkeitskirche (de)
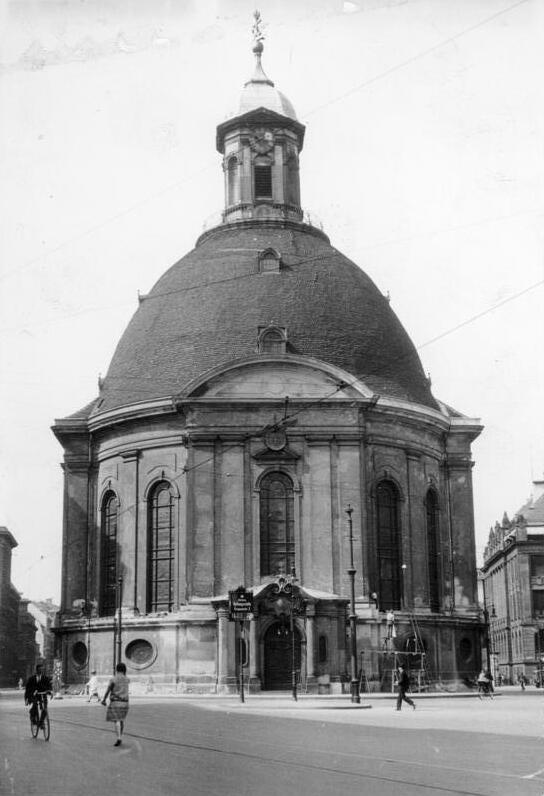
- Trinity Church around 1930, seen from south (southern Mauerstraße)

Religion
- Affiliation: United Protestant since the 1820s, originally Reformed (Calvinist).
- Province: last: Evangelical Church of the old-Prussian Union

Location
- Location: Friedrichstadt quarter within Mitte borough of Berlin
- Interactive map of Trinity Church
- Coordinates: 52°30′42″N 13°23′11″E

Architecture
- Architects: Titus de Favre (1737–1739), Christian August Naumann (1737–1739)
- Type: round church
- Style: Baroque
- Completed: 1739

Specifications
- Direction of façade: North
- Dome height (outer): 57 m
- Dome dia. (inner): 22 m

Trinity Church (German: Dreifaltigkeitskirche) was a Baroque Protestant church in Berlin, eastern Germany, dedicated to the Holy Trinity. It was opened in August 1739 and destroyed in November 1943, with its rubble removed in 1947.

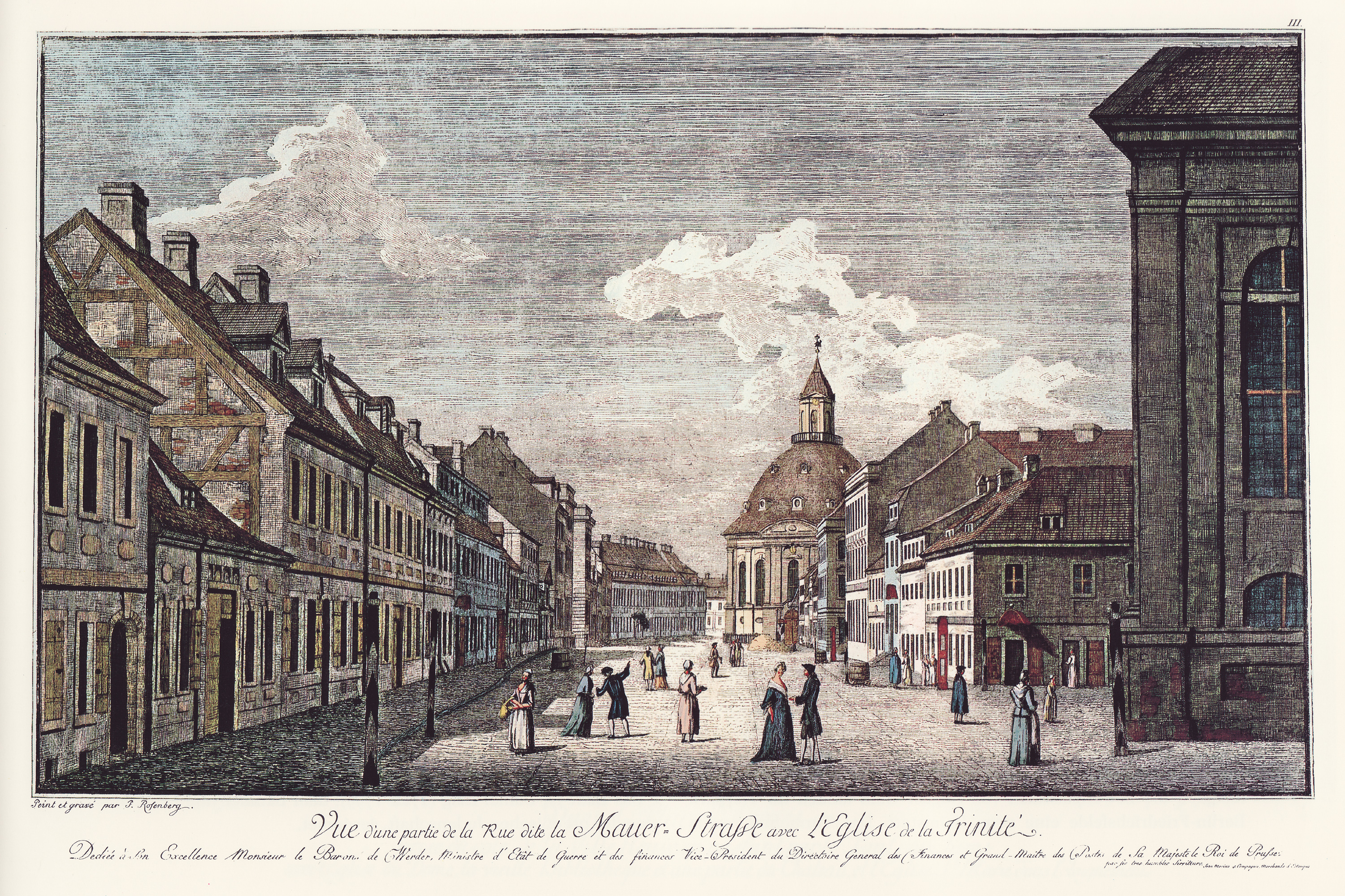
View of northern Mauerstraße, including Trinity Church, c 1780

It was located in the Friedrichstadt district (now part of the Mitte borough), at the intersection of Mauerstraße, Kanonierstraße (now known as Glinkastraße) and Mohrenstraße at the postcode 10117 Berlin. Three domestic houses used as a vicarages were built on Glinkastraße/Taubenstraße and the two which survived World War II are still part of the parish today (Glinkastraße 16 and Taubenstraße 3.). A similar church, the 1737 Böhmische Bethlehems-Kirche was also nearby (Bethlehemskirchplatz).

== History ==
The expansion of Berlin by Frederick William I of Prussia led to a need for new church buildings. The first stone for Trinity Church was laid in August 1737 and Titus Favre made head of works. It was designed by Christian August Naumann as a circular building with four short projections, suggesting a cross shape.

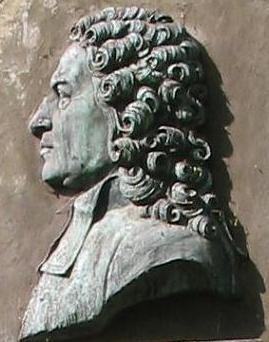
Johann Julius Hecker (1707–1768), the first pastor at Trinity Church

It also had a 22m diameter dome over the centre of the cross, consisting of a tiled wooden structure with an octagonal lantern that served as a bell tower, internally decorated with representations of the Four Evangelists. The nave was initially surrounded by three galleries, with the pulpit altar, organ and a second altar on the east side. The church was inaugurated on 30 August 1739 and for around a hundred years after that was the newest Protestant church building in Berlin. Its first pastor, the teacher and theologian Julius Hecker, was appointed by Frederick William himself.

During Napoleon I's occupation of Berlin the church was temporarily used as a barracks, whilst the theologian Friedrich Schleiermacher preached there from 1809 to 1834 and also confirmed the future chancellor Otto von Bismarck in the church in 1831.

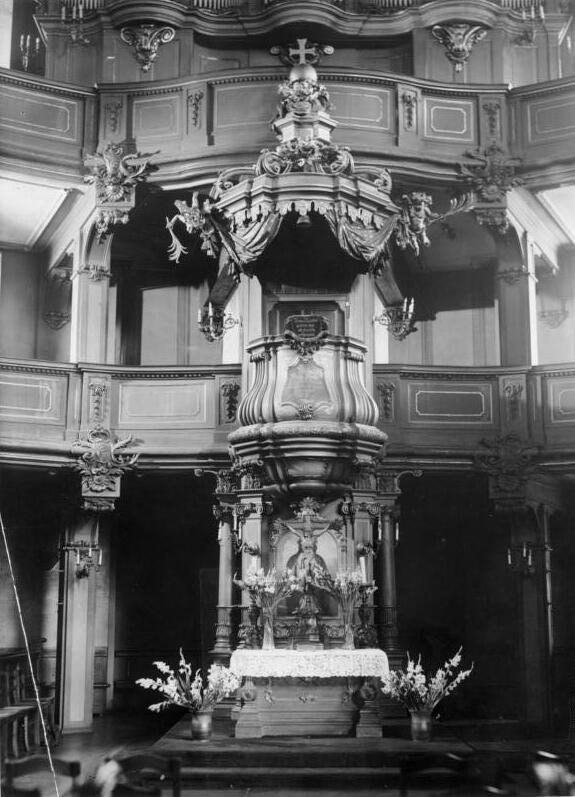
Interior: the typical Protestant pulpit altar, photo 1939.

Schleiermacher, who had made the case for a union of the Lutheran and Calvinist congregations in Prussia, persuaded the congregation not only to join the united umbrella Evangelical Church in Prussia (est. in 1817) but to also adopt the union confession for the congregation itself, which was not required but introduced by a handful of congregations in Berlin.

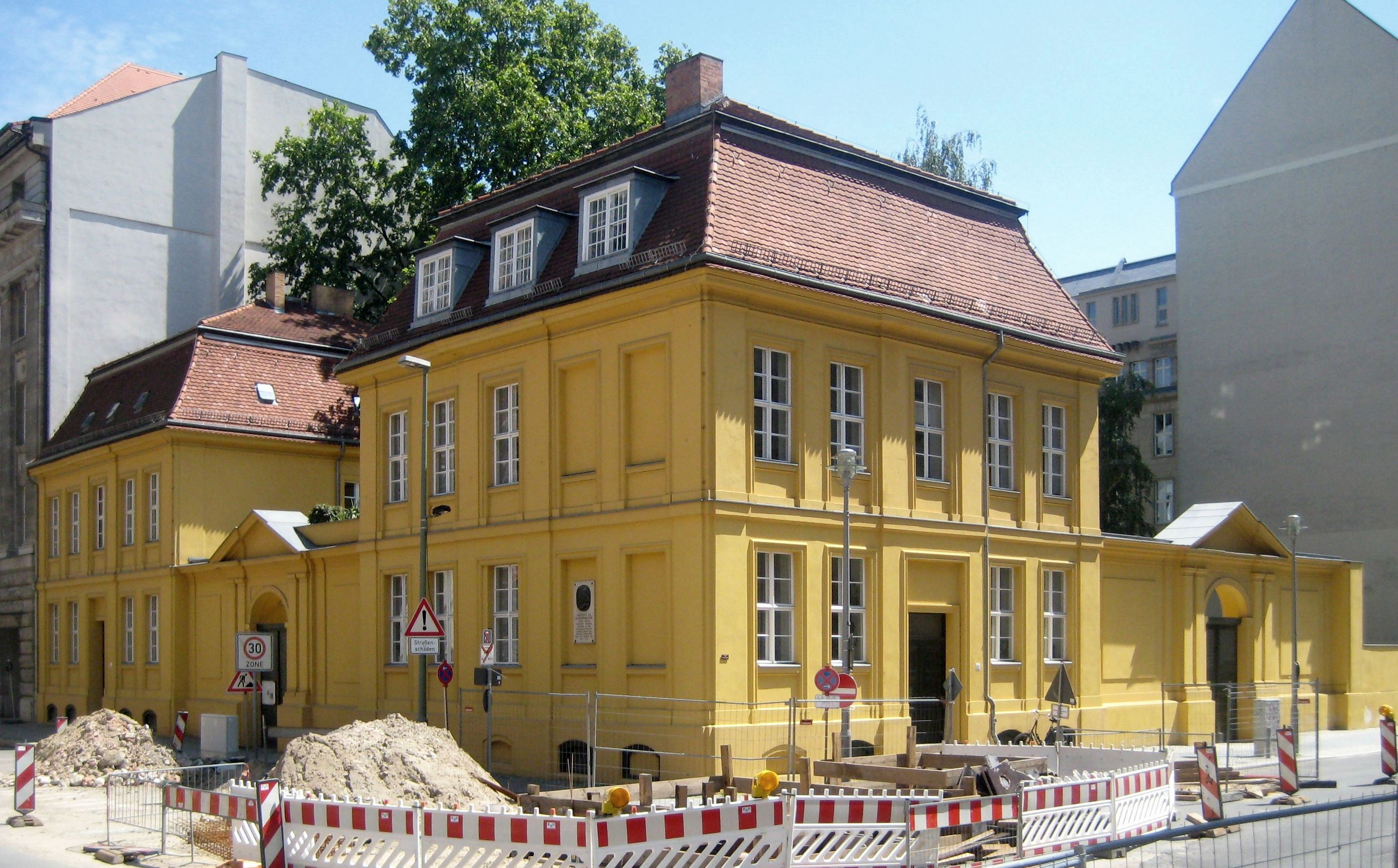
The baroque rectory on the corner of Taubenstraße and Glinkastraße.

The upper gallery was rebuilt by the architect Adolf Lohse in 1864. Ernst Hermann von Dryander (1843–1922) was the church's pastor from 1882 to 1898, during which time a baptistery and a new vestry porch were added to plans by the architects Carl Vohl and Friedrich Schulze between 1885 and 1886.

Paul von Hindenburg went to Sunday service at the church, whilst Dietrich Bonhoeffer preached at university services there during his time as lecturer and chaplain at the TU Berlin from 1932 to 1933.

The church above ground was destroyed by bombing in November 1943. The cellar and ruins were then used as a Nazi Party facility and bunker. In April 1945, Hermann Fegelein was interrogated by Heinrich Müller in the facility shortly before Fegelein was executed. The Nazi facility was demolished in 1947.

The parish continued holding services after the war until at least the 1970s in the rectory on Wilhelmstraße 115.

== Cemeteries ==
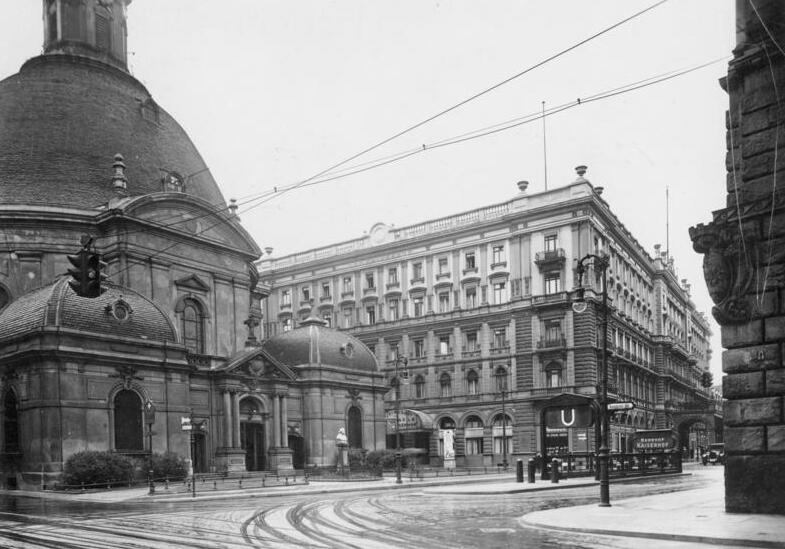
Northern main entrance of Trinity Church (1931), right the eastward entrance of Kaiserhof underground station.

The congregation comprised many known Berliners as parishioners since its parish included quarters of central Berlin fancy to live in among the better off in the 19th century. The cemeteries still preserve many graves of known parishioners. The cemeteries are each called Dreifaltigkeitsfriedhof and are numbered:

- Dreifaltigkeitsfriedhof I, opened in 1739, located amidst a compound of cemeteries of seven congregations, therefore there is no direct access but either via Friedhof I der Jerusalems- und Neuen Kirche, Zossener Straße opposite to #58, or via Friedhof III der Jerusalems- und Neuen Kirche, Mehringdamm 21 (near the homonymous U-Bahn station), both Berlin-Kreuzberg
- Dreifaltigkeitsfriedhof II, opened in 1825, Bergmannstraße 39–41, Berlin-Kreuzberg
- Dreifaltigkeitsfriedhof III, opened in 1900, Eisenacher Straße 61, Berlin-Mariendorf

== Sources ==
- (in German) Rudolf Herz: Berliner Barock. Bauten und Baumeister aus der ersten Hälfte des 18. Jahrhunderts. Deutsche Verlagsgesellschaft für Politik und Geschichte M. B. H., Berlin 1928
- (in German) W. Boeck, H. Richartz: Alte Berliner Kirchen. Atlantis-Verlag, Berlin 1937, S. 82
- (in German) Günther Kühne, Elisabeth Stephani: Evangelische Kirchen in Berlin. Christlicher Zeitschriftenverlag, Berlin 1978, ISBN 3-7674-0158-4, S. 377.
