= Church of La Soledad, Mexico City =

Church building in Mexico City, Mexico

Church of La Soledad Iglesia de Santa Cruz y La Soledad (in Spanish)
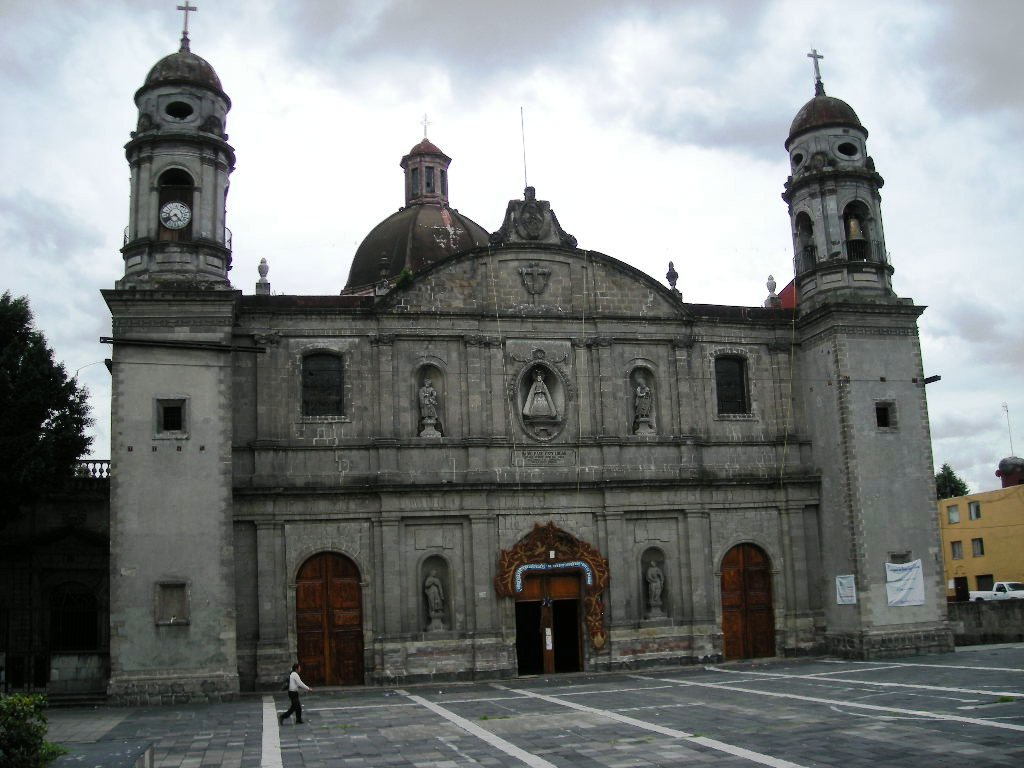
- Facade of the church

Religion
- Affiliation: Roman Catholic
- Diocese: Roman Catholic Archdiocese of Mexico
- Ecclesiastical or organisational status: Parish church
- Year consecrated: 1792

Location
- Location: Mexico City, Mexico
- Interactive map of Church of La Soledad; Iglesia de Santa Cruz y La Soledad (in Spanish)
- Coordinates: 19°25′54.16″N 99°7′22.91″W

Architecture
- Architects: Cayetano de Sigüenza, Ildefonso Iniesta Bejarano, Francisco Antonio de Guerrero y Torres, Ignacio Castera
- Type: Church
- Style: Neo classic
- Completed: 1787

The Church of La Soledad, officially known as the Church of Santa Cruz y La Soledad, is a Roman Catholic parish church of México City.

The parish of Santa Cruz y La Soledad was the seventh parish established in Mexico City. The original church was an Augustinians doctrina de indios that was secularized by the archbishop in 1750. In the latter 18th century, the church was rebuilt in Neoclassic style, which remains to this day. The church deteriorated over time, but despite this was declared a national monument in 1931. In 1982, the building was restored. The church is located in the La Merced neighborhood with the Plaza de la Soledad located in front. This neighborhood is known for prostitution, and sex workers have staged commemorations for a National Day of Sexual Workers in front of this church.

== History ==
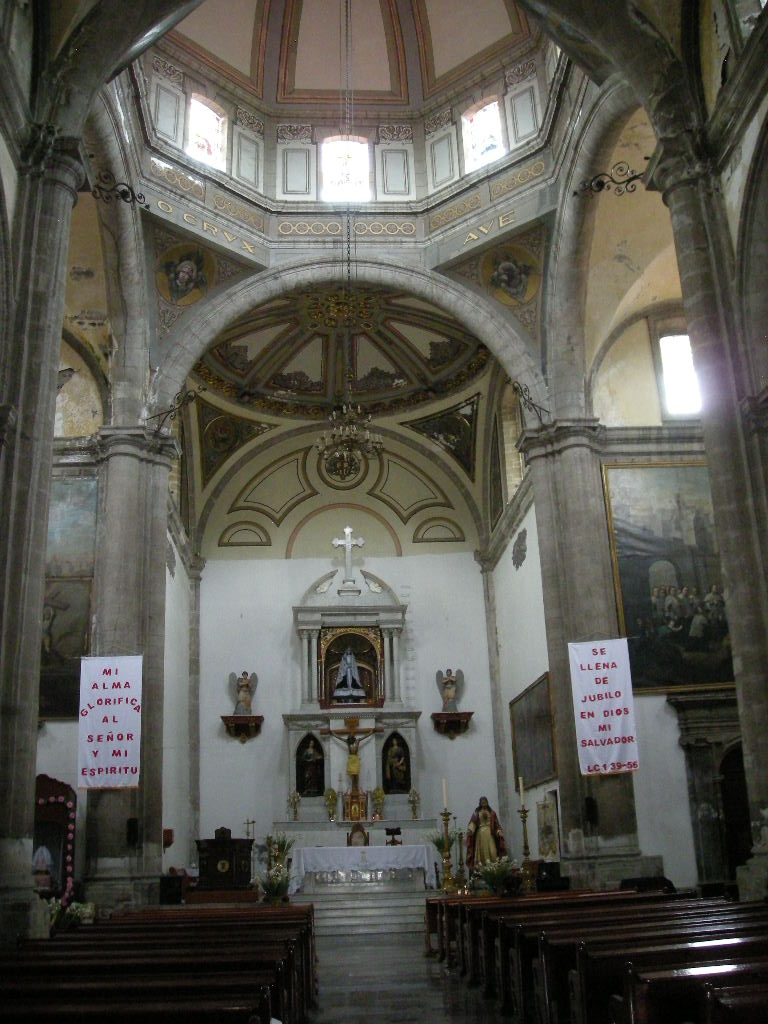
Main nave

The current building is the second on the site, originally called Santa Cruz (Contzinco). According to documents from the time, the architecture of the original church was Renaissance style, built with masonry and topped with a vault in sandstone. The church was under the tenure of the Augustinians from 1633 to 1750, with the most important feature being the Virgen de la Soledad. After the Augustinians left this site, the church was rebuilt by Father Gregorio Pérez Cancio with the help of architects Cayetano de Sigüenza, Ildefonso Iniesta Bejarano, Francisco Antonio de Guerrero y Torres and Ignacio Castera. It was finished in 1787 and consecrated in 1792.

Over time, the church lost most of its luster. Its annex became a home for indians in the 1930s, and a school, leaving the church with about half of its original space. Various thefts from the 1940s to the 1970s caused the loss of candelabras, silver chalices and a reliquary. In 1970, a bus crash considerably damaged the outer fence and cracked an exterior wall. The building was declared a national monument in 1931 and was restored in 1982, allowing it to recover some of its original colonial look.

The Merced area of the city now is a well-known area for prostitution. An annual “National Day of Sexual Workers” (Spanish: Día Nacional de las y los Trabajadores Sexuales) is observed here to remember the violence that is often perpetrated against sex workers.

== Description ==
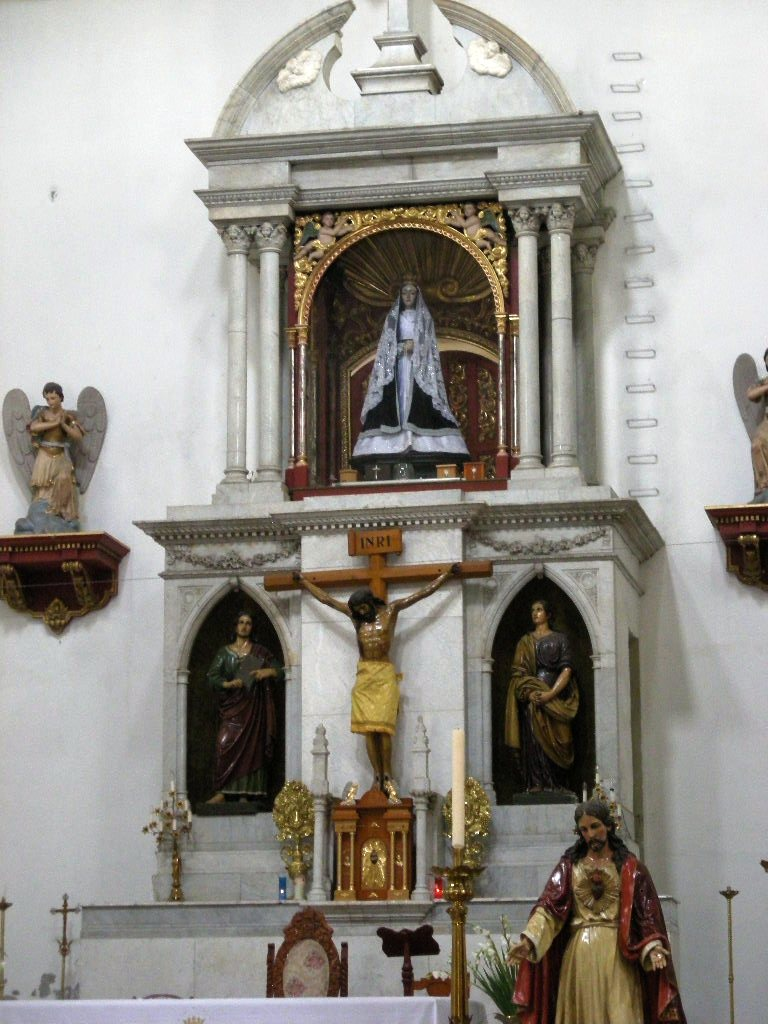
Area with the image of the Virgin of Solitude

The facade of the 18th-century building is Neoclassic, covered in slabs of gray sandstone, with the pilasters of the same material. It divides into five sections with a main portal that has two levels and a crest. The ornamentation of the portal includes symbols of the Passion and figures of John the Baptist, Mary Magdalene and others. At the center of the second level is an image of the Virgen de la Soledad framed by pairs of Ionic pilasters. The other sections of the facade are divided by pilasters and have sculptures of Nicodemus and Joseph of Arimathea. The entirety is topped by an entablature, which contains two crests and a curved pediment with a relief of a cross. To the sides of the facade are two large circular bell towers, each containing four arches.

The interior is rectangular with three naves. Six sculpted Neoclassical columns support the main nave, with arches supporting other parts of the building. The roof is formed by barrel vaults with lunettes in the three main areas of the central nave. The cupola is in the shape of an octagon. Above the presbytery, there is another vault and a roof formed by eight small barrel vaults. The floor is done in mosaic, red and white in the main nave with green and white in the presbytery and a marble staircase. Eight windows line the side walls and eight are in the cupola, allowing in a large quantity of natural light.

The choir area is large, extending over the back of the three naves and supported by three arches. The area is enclosed by a wrought iron railing with small bells which are originals. The tabernacle area is made of wood and contains an image of the Virgen de la Soledad, in a black robe with silver embroidery.

The current marble altar was placed here in 1903 and is purely neoclassic as are the pulpit and the balustrade of the choir. Most of the furnishings date from the 19th century. There are paintings in the sacristy, and notable one by Miguel Cabrera called “La Santísima Trinidad.”

== See also ==
- List of colonial churches in Mexico City
