= Al-Nabi Mosque, Qazvin =

Shi'ite mosque in Qazvīn, Iran

Shah Mosque of Qazvīn
- مسجد شاه قزوین
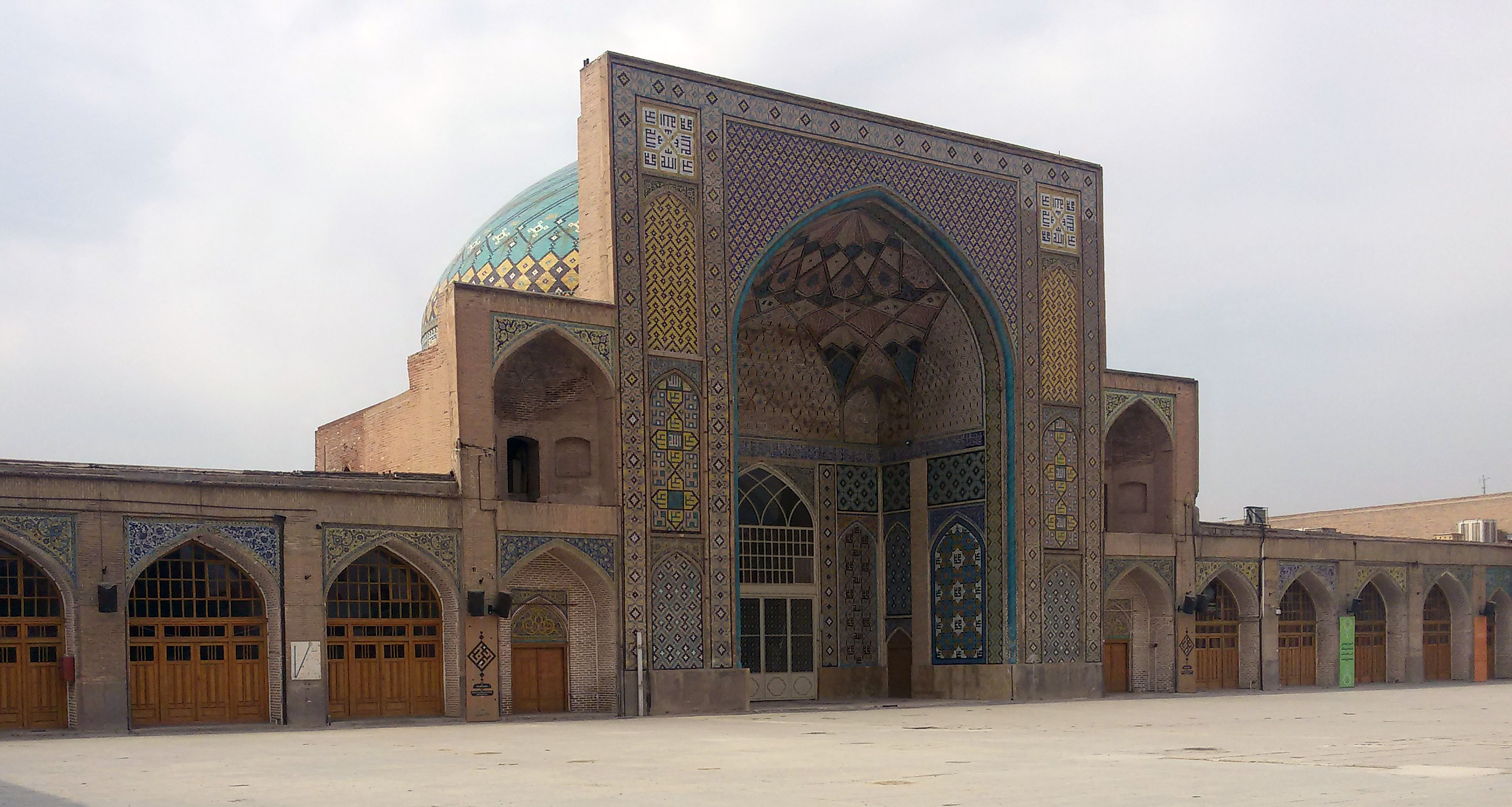

Religion
- Affiliation: Shia Islam
- Ecclesiastical or organisational status: Mosque
- Status: Active

Location
- Location: Qazvīn, Qazvīn County, Qazvīn Province
- Country: Iran
- Interactive map of Shah Mosque of Qazvīn
- Coordinates: 36°16′06″N 49°59′56″E

Architecture
- Type: Mosque architecture
- Style: Safavid
- Founder: Fath-Ali Shah Qajar
- Completed: 1787

Specifications
- Interior area: c.14,000 m^{2} (150,000 sq ft)
- Dome: One
- Dome dia. (inner): 15 m (49 ft)

Iran National Heritage List
- Official name: Shah Mosque
- Type: Mosque
- Designated: 1955
- Reference no.: 390
- Conservation organization: Cultural Heritage, Handicrafts and Tourism Organization of Iran

The al-Nabi Mosque (Persian: مسجد شاه قزوین, romanized: Masjed al-Nabi; also known as مسجد سلطانى, Masjed-e Soltani), is a Shi'ite mosque in the city of Qazvīn, in the province of Qazvīn, Iran.

The mosque was added to the Iran National Heritage List on 6 January 1932 and on 20 June 1958, administered by the Cultural Heritage, Handicrafts and Tourism Organization of Iran.

== Overview ==
The mosque bears inscriptions indicating that Fath-Ali Shah Qajar was the founder of the mosque. However, other sources indicate that the mosque was established during the Safavid era. It is now believed that the architect of the structure was Ustad Mirza Shirazi with the date of construction being 1787 CE. The mosque is also known as Masjed Nabi, Masjed Soltani, or Masjed Shah.

The mosque has an internal area of approximately 14,000 square metres (150,000 sq ft), and the inner diameter of the double-layered dome measures 15 metres (49 ft).

== Gallery ==
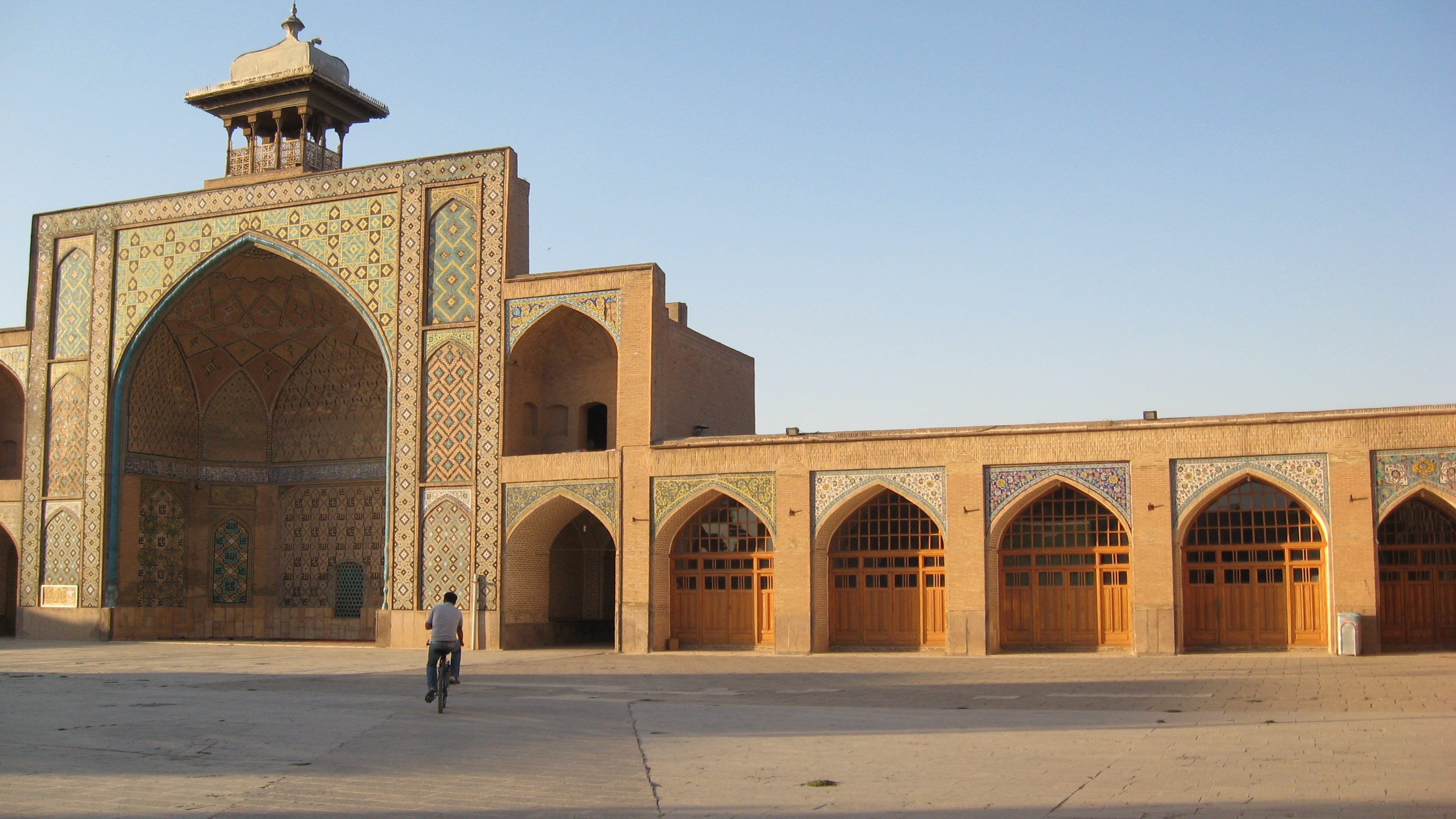

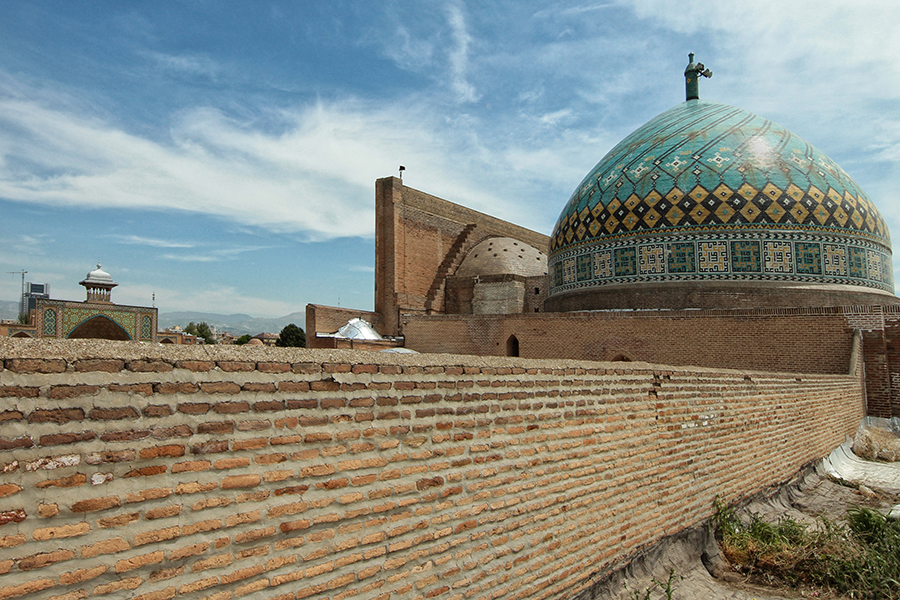

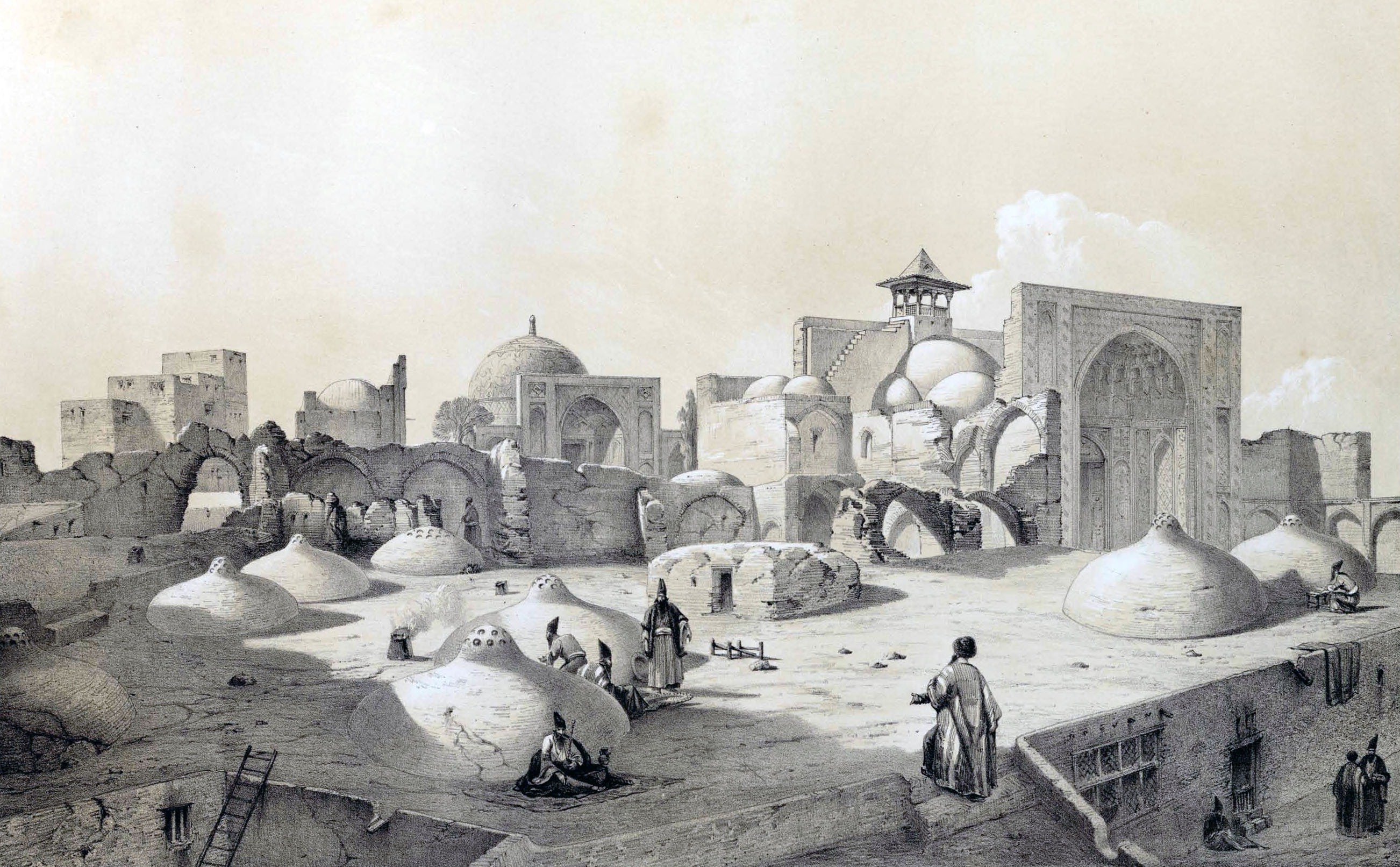
The mosque in 1849

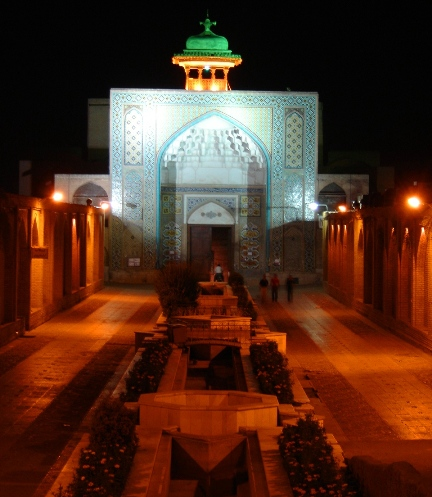
Entrance to the mosque

== See also ==
- Shia Islam in Iran
- List of mosques in Iran
