= Cenotaph to Matthew Henry =

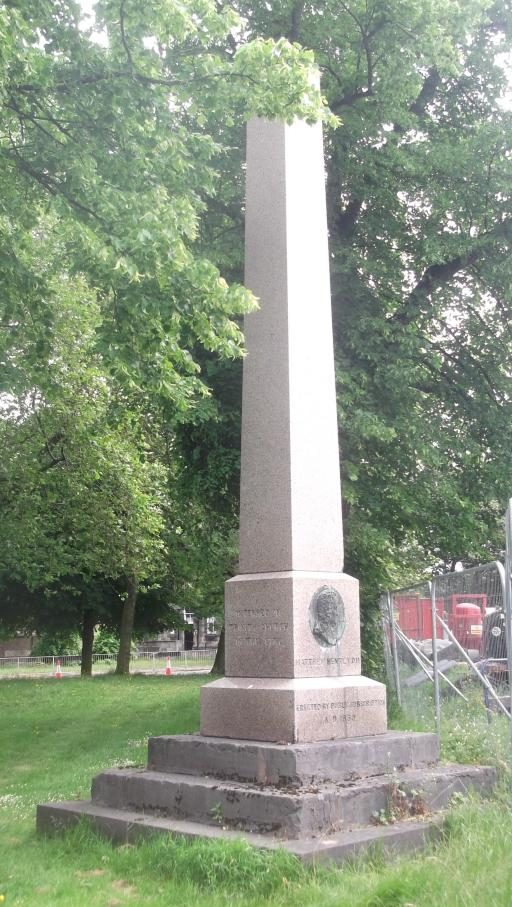

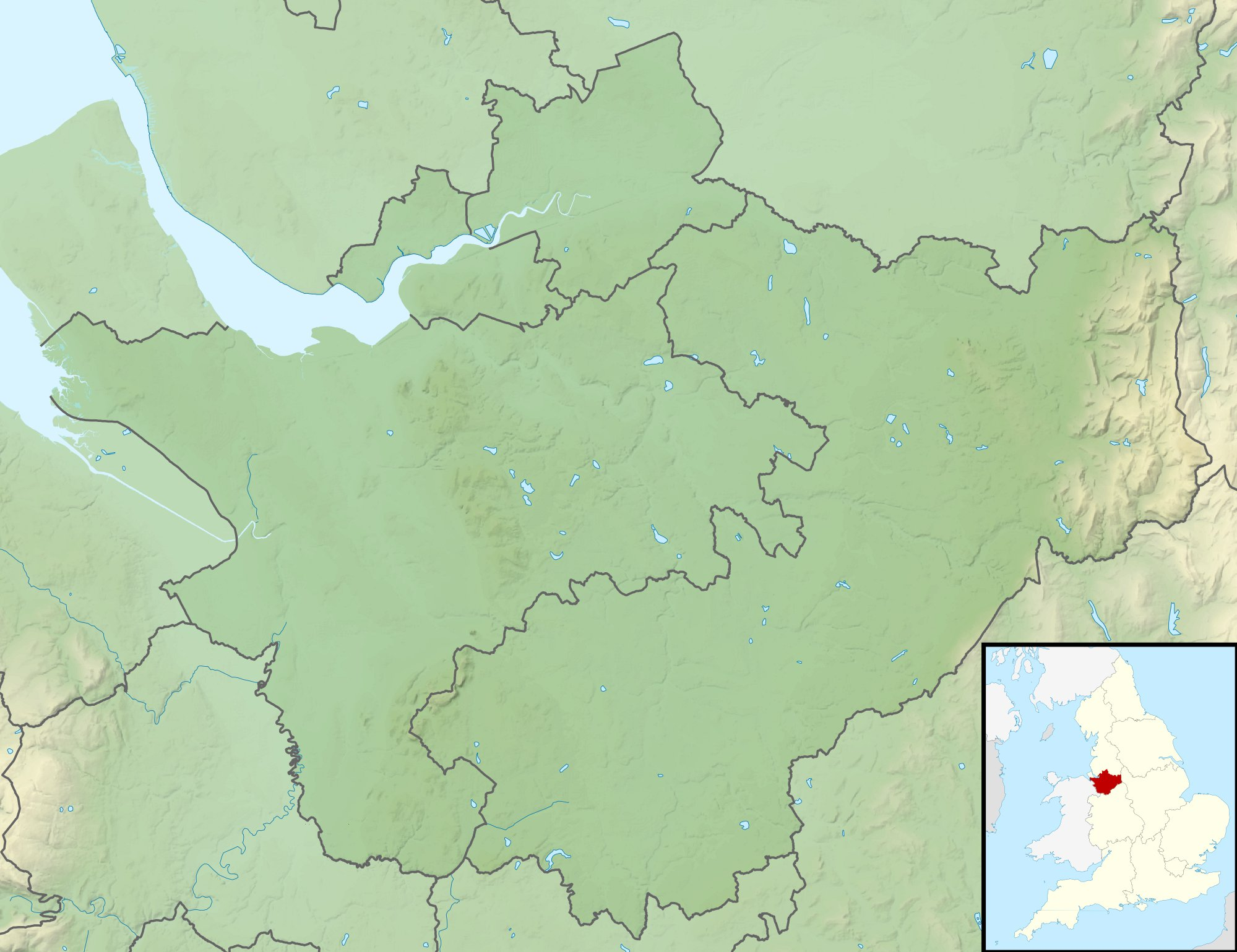
- Location within Cheshire
- 53.1868°N 2.8934°W
- Type: Memorial
- Location: Chester, Cheshire

History
- Built: 1860

Listed Building – Grade II
- Official name: Cenotaph to Matthew Henry on Grosvenor Street Roundabout
- Designated: 6 August 1988
- Reference no.: 1376328

The Cenotaph to Matthew Henry stands on a roundabout opposite the entrance to Chester Castle, Chester, Cheshire, England. It contains a medallion by Matthew Noble, and is recorded in the National Heritage List for England as a designated Grade II listed building.

== History ==
Matthew Henry (1662–1714) was a Presbyterian minister, preacher and writer, who founded the Presbyterian Chapel in Trinity Street, Chester. In 1858 a public meeting was held, chaired by the Mayor of Chester, to invite subscriptions to a memorial fund in the name of Matthew Henry. This was intended to provide a statue near Chester Castle, to produce a cheap edition of Henry's commentary on the Bible, and to create a scholarship in his name at Oxford University. However, there was a problem because after Henry's death, in about 1750, the Trinity Street Chapel had become Unitarian, and it was decided that the Unitarians should be excluded from taking part in the fund raising. As a consequence, subscriptions came in very slowly, and it was decided that, rather than a statue, the memorial should consist of an obelisk. The obelisk was to be erected in the churchyard of St Bridget's Church, the site being provided free of charge by the rector. The architect was Thomas Harrison, and the sculptor of the bronze portrait medallion was Matthew Noble; both gave their services free. The mason was A. McDonald of Aberdeen, and the total cost came to £267 (equivalent to £28,000 in 2025). The obelisk was unveiled on 22 August 1860. St Bridget's Church was demolished in 1892, but the obelisk remained in the churchyard until the building of Chester's inner ring road in the 1960s. It was then moved to a roundabout opposite the castle.

== Description ==
The obelisk is in polished granite and has a height of about 5.8 metres (19.0 ft). The portrait medallion in bronze is about 5 metres (16.4 ft) high, and is signed "M.NOBLE SC 1860". The obelisk stands on a square base of three sandstone steps. The inscription on the obelisk reads as follows.

MATTHEW HENRY VDM BORN 18TH OCTOBER 1662 DIED 22ND JUNE 1714
INTERRED IN TRINITY CHURCH IN THIS CITY

The statue was designated as a Grade II listed building on 6 August 1998. Grade II is the lowest of the three grades of listing and is applied to "buildings of national importance and special interest".

== See also ==
- Grade II listed buildings in Chester (central)
