= 2019 in architecture =

The year 2019 in architecture involved some significant architectural events and new buildings.

== Events ==
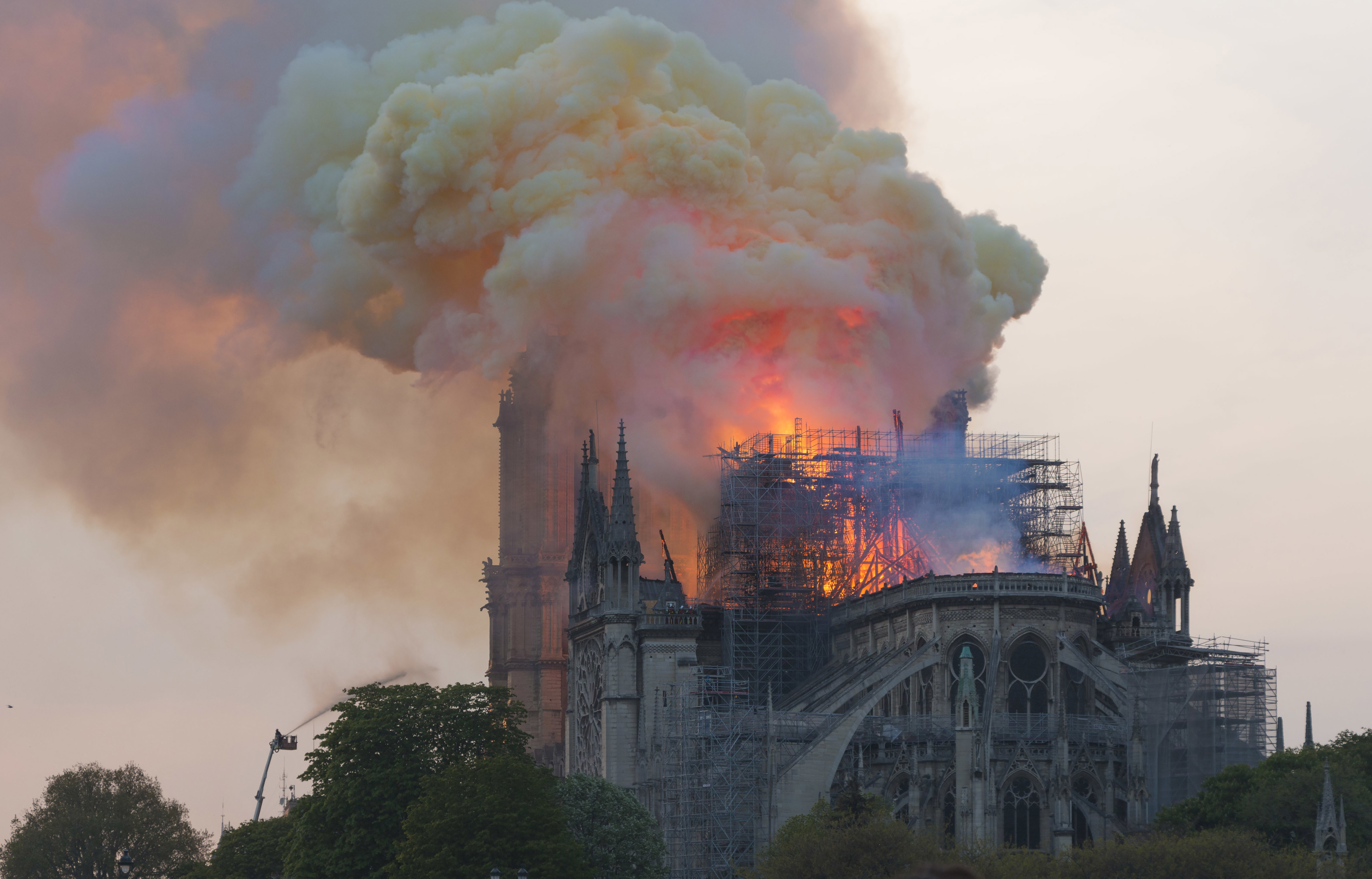
Notre-Dame de Paris fire

- April 15 – Notre-Dame de Paris fire: A major fire at the medieval cathedral of Notre-Dame de Paris causes the collapse of the roof and spire.

== Buildings and structures ==
Algeria

- Djamaa el Djazaïr, Great Mosque of Algiers, designed by KSP Juergen Engel Architekten, completed in May.

Australia

- Brisbane Skytower, the tallest building in Brisbane (2019–present), is completed.

Bangladesh

- Beyond Survival Safe Space for Rohingya Women and Girls, Rohingya Refugee Camp, Alikhali, Teknaf, designed by Rizvi Hassan and team.

China

- Beijing Daxing International Airport terminal building, designed by Zaha Hadid Architects, the world's second-largest single-building airport terminal, completed June 30 (official opening September 25).
- Wuhan Greenland Center in Wuhan, the tallest building in China, designed by Adrian Smith + Gordon Gill Architects in conjunction with Thornton Tomasetti Engineers, projected for completion.

Finland

- Design Hotel Levi in Lapland designed by PAVE Architects, opened in November.

France

- Le Monde headquarters building, by Snøhetta in Paris, expected completion in November.

Germany

- Berlin Palace reconstruction as Humboldt Forum, designed by Franco Stella, scheduled for opening September 14.
- Bauhaus Museum Dessau, designed by addenda architects (González Hinz Zabala) of Barcelona, opened September 8.
- New Bauhaus Museum Weimar, designed by Heike Hanada with Benedict Tonon, scheduled for opening April 6.

Japan

- The New National Stadium, Tokyo designed by Kengo Kuma, which will serve as the main stadium for the opening and closing ceremonies, as well as the venue for track and field events at the 2020 Summer Olympics and 2020 Summer Paralympics, is completed.

Mexico

- Alfredo Harp Helú baseball stadium, home of the Diablos Rojos del México (Red Devils) is inaugurated in Mexico City on March 23.

Norway

- Mjøstårnet in Brumunddal, the tallest timber building in the world, completed in March.

Panama

- Atlantic Bridge over the Panama Canal, opened 2 August.

Paraguay

- Unión hebraica de Paraguay Synagogue (reconstruction), Asunción, designed by Equipo de Arquitectura.

Qatar

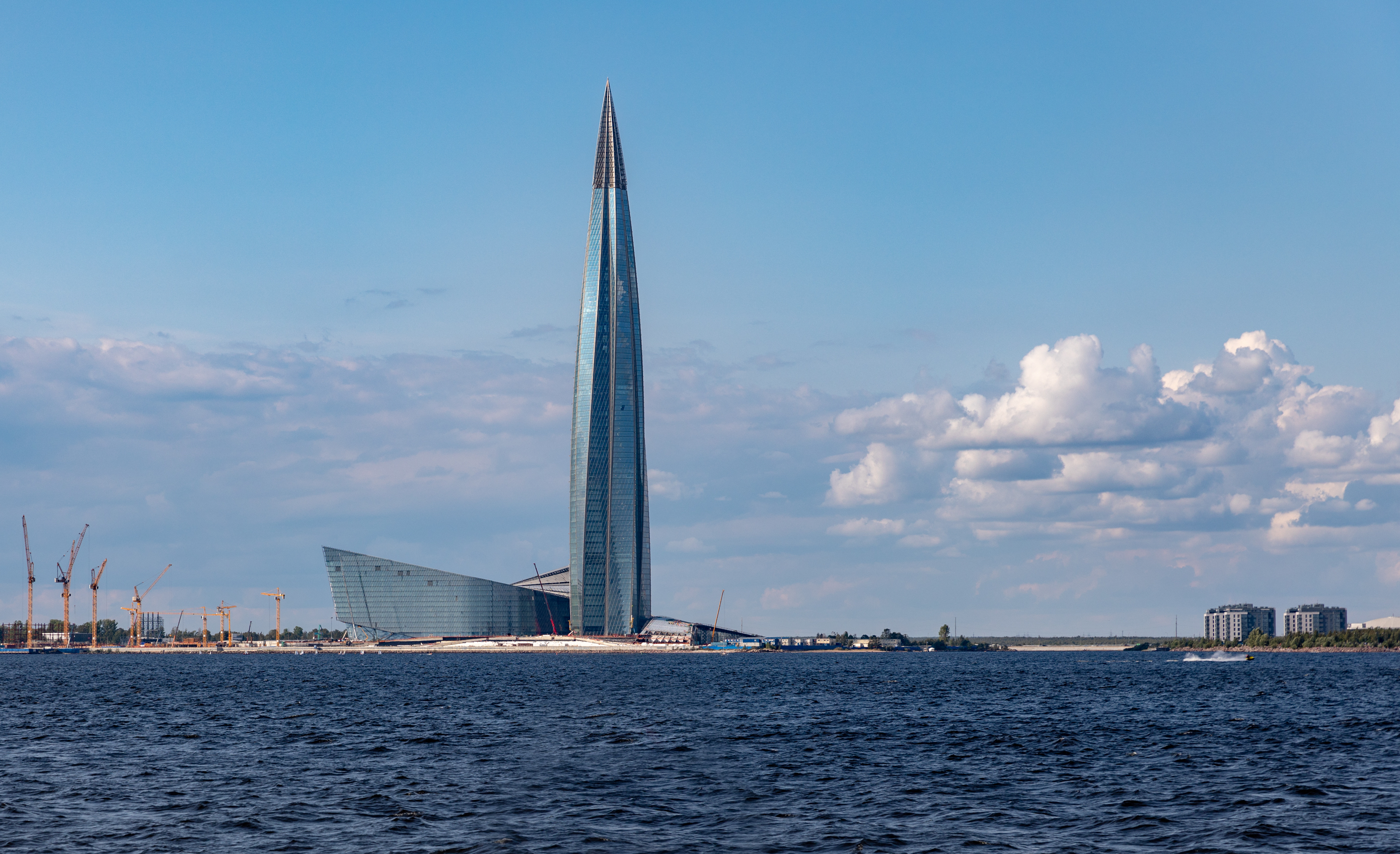
Lakhta Center, in St. Petersburg, Russia

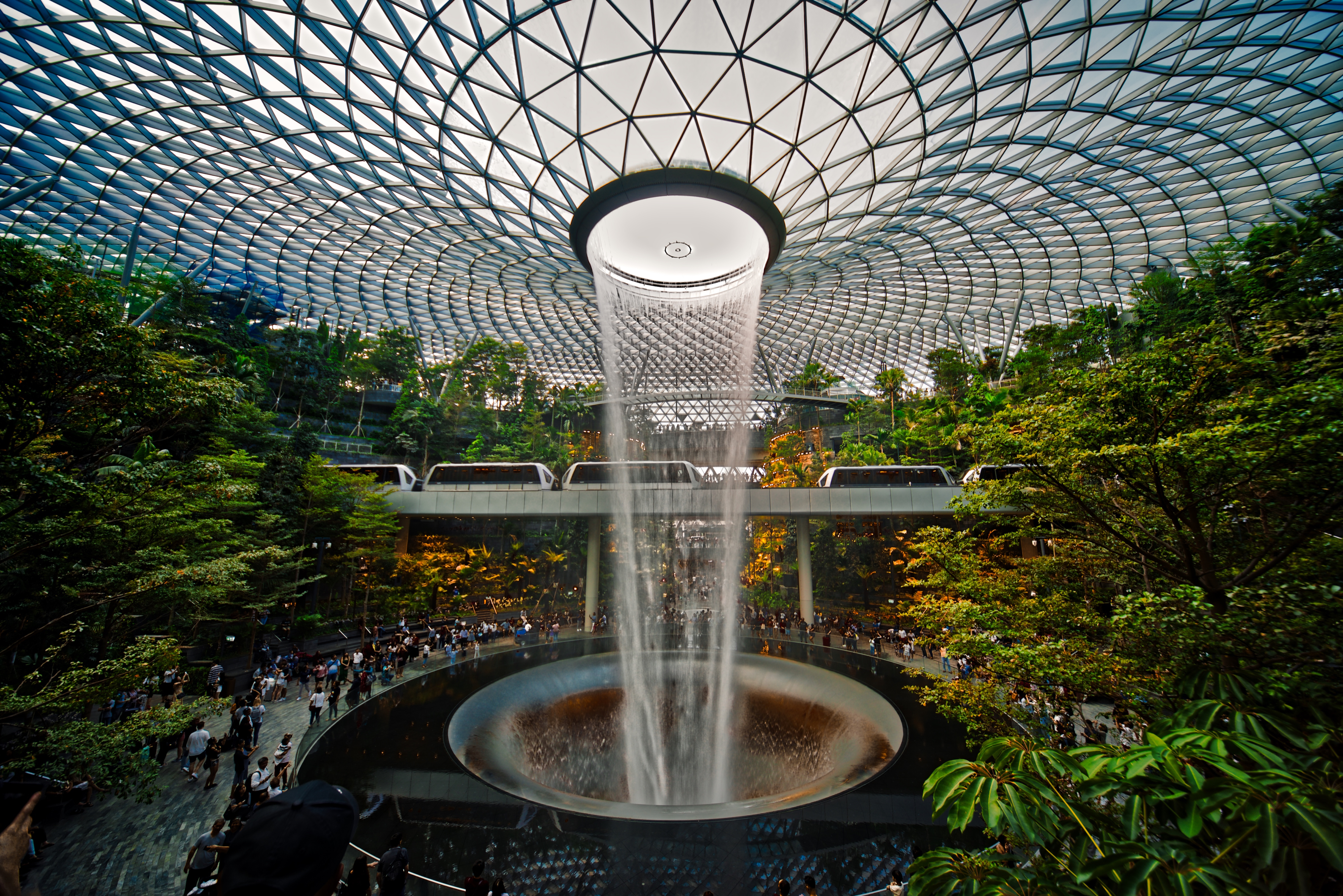
Jewel Changi Airport terminal complex in Singapore

- National Museum of Qatar in Doha, Qatar opened on 28 March.
- Al Janoub Stadium outside Doha, opened 17 May

Russia

- Crimean Bridge between Crimea and Russia, the longest bridge in Europe, the rail section of the bridge opened 25 December.
- Lakhta Center, in St. Petersburg, the tallest building in Europe, completed.

Senegal

- Fass school and teachers' residence, designed by Toshiko Mori, opened 2 February.

Singapore

- Jewel Changi Airport terminal complex, design-led by Moshe Safdie, opened 17 April.

Spain

- Can Sau Emergency Scenery, Olot, Catalonia, designed by unparelld'arquitectes, built.

United Kingdom

- Cambridge Central Mosque, designed by Marks Barfield (lead architect: Julia Barfield), opened for worship 24 April.
- Key Worker Housing, Eddington, North West Cambridge development, designed by Stanton Williams, completed.
- Orchard Gardens, Elephant Park, residential/retail development, Elephant and Castle, London, by Panter Hudspith Architects, completed.
- Tottenham Hotspur Stadium, London, designed by Populous (lead architect: Christopher Lee), opened 3 April.
- Windermere Jetty: Museum of Boats, Steam and Stories, near Bowness-on-Windermere in the English Lake District, designed by Carmody Groarke, opened March.
- MK Gallery, Milton Keynes, by 6a architects.
- Library & Study Centre, St John's College, Oxford, designed by Wright & Wright Architects, opened to readers 2 September.
- Cantilevered steel footbridge at Tintagel Castle, designed by Ney & Partners and William Matthews Associates, opening rescheduled to 11 August.
- Nithurst Farm, West Sussex, residence designed by Adam Richards for himself.

United States

- 40 Tenth Avenue aka "Solar Carve" adjacent to the High Line in New York City, designed by Jeanne Gang and Studio Gang Architects is completed.
- 540 West 25th Street in the Chelsea section of Manhattan, New York City by Bonetti/Kozerski Architecture, the new global headquarters of Pace Gallery, slated for completion and scheduled to open for business in September.
- The Shed by lead architect Diller Scofidio + Renfro and collaborating architect Rockwell Group at the Hudson Yards building complex in New York City completed and opened to the public on April 5.
- The Vessel, by Thomas Heatherwick, at the Hudson Yards building complex in New York City, opened to the public on March 15.
- TWA Hotel by Beyer Blinder Belle (original Flight Center by Eero Saarinen- renovation of) and Lubrano Ciavarra Architects, at JFK Airport in Queens, New York, opens on May 15.
- Adohi Hall at the University of Arkansas in Fayetteville, Arkansas by Leers Weinzapfel Associates opens.

Vietnam

- Bó Mon Preschool, Tú Nang, designed by KIENTRUC O, opened June.

== Exhibitions ==
- May 15 until January 5, 2020 "Housing Density From Tenements to Towers" at the Skyscraper Museum in New York City curated by Matthias Altwicker and Nicholas Dagen Bloom.

== Awards ==
- AIA Gold Medal – Richard Rogers
- Architecture Firm Award AIA – Payette
- Driehaus Architecture Prize for New Classical Architecture – Maurice Culot
- Emporis Skyscraper Award – Lakhta Center, Lakhta, Saint Petersburg, Russia
- European Union Prize for Contemporary Architecture (Mies van der Rohe Prize) – Lacaton & Vassal
- Grand Prix de l'urbanisme – Patrick Bouchain
- Grand prix national de l'architecture –
- Lawrence Israel Prize - Alexandra Champalimaud
- LEAF Award, Overall Winner – Mozhao Architects
- Praemium Imperiale Architecture Laureate –
- Pritzker Architecture Prize – Arata Isozaki
- RAIA Gold Medal – Hank Koning and Julie Eizenberg
- RIAS Award for Architecture –
- RIBA Royal Gold Medal – Sir Nicholas Grimshaw
- Stirling Prize – Mikhail Riches with Cathy Hawley for Goldsmith Street, Norwich
- Thomas Jefferson Medal in Architecture – Kazuyo Sejima and Ryue Nishizawa
- Twenty-five Year Award AIA – Venturi, Scott Brown and Associates
- Vincent Scully Prize – Elizabeth K. Meyer

== Deaths ==
- January 22 – Charles Vandenhove, Belgian architect (born 1927)
- January 25 – Florence Knoll, American architect and furniture designer (Knoll Furniture) (born 1917)
- February 11 – Allan Wild, New Zealand architect and professor (born 1927)
- February 13 – Jörg Streli, Austrian architect (b. 1940)
- February 18 – Alessandro Mendini, Italian architect and designer (Groninger Museum) (born 1931)
- February 20 – Francisco Mañosa, Filipino architect (Coconut Palace, EDSA Shrine) (born 1931)
- March 1 – Kevin Roche, Irish-born American architect (born 1922)
- March 16 – Sir William Whitfield, English architect (born 1920)
- March 27 – Friedrich Achleitner, Austrian architecture critic and poet (born 1930)
- March 29 – Tao Ho, Hong Kong architect (Hong Kong Arts Centre) (born 1936)
- May 7 – Alexander Cvijanović, Yugoslav/American architect (born 1923)
- May 16 – I. M. Pei, Chinese born American architect (Bank of China Tower, East Building of The National Gallery of Art, Louvre Pyramid, Museum of Islamic Art, Doha - Pritzker Prize winner 1983) (born 1917)
- June 3 – Stanley Tigerman, American architect, theorist, and designer (born 1930)
- June 15 – Wilhelm Holzbauer, Austrian architect (born 1930)
- July 9 – Phil Freelon, American architect (born 1953)
- July 19 – César Pelli, Argentine architect (Petronas Towers, Carnegie Hall Tower) (death announced on date) (born 1926)
- August 1 – Richard Vyškovský, Czech architect and creator of paper models (born 1929)
- September 4 – Timothy Seow, Singaporean architect (born 1937/38)
- October 3 – Roger Taillibert, French architect (Parc des Princes - Olympic Stadium, Montreal) (born 1926).
- October 13 – Charles Jencks, 80, American architect, cultural theorist (Post-modernism) (born 1939)
- November 6 – Juliaan Lampens, 96, Belgian architect (born 1926)
- November 11 – Edward Cullinan, 88, British architect (Charles Cryer Theatre, Weald and Downland Gridshell) (born 1931)
- November 17 – Gustav Peichl, 91, Austrian architect (ORF regional studios, Kunst- und Ausstellungshalle der Bundesrepublik Deutschland) (born 1928)

== See also ==
- Timeline of architecture
