= 1923 in architecture =

| List of years in architecture | (table) |
- … 1913; 1914; 1915; 1916; 1917; 1918; 1919; 1920; 1921; 1922; 1923; 1924; 1925; 1926; 1927; 1928; 1929; 1930; 1931; 1932; 1933 …
- Buildings and structures: Art; Archaeology; Architecture; Literature; Music; Philosophy; Science; +...

The year 1923 in architecture involved some significant architectural events and new buildings.

== Events ==
- Vers une architecture by Le Corbusier (later translated into English as Towards a New Architecture) is published.
- Bauhaus expressionist architecture phase ends.
- Liebenberg and Kaplan architectural practice established in Minneapolis.

== Buildings and structures ==
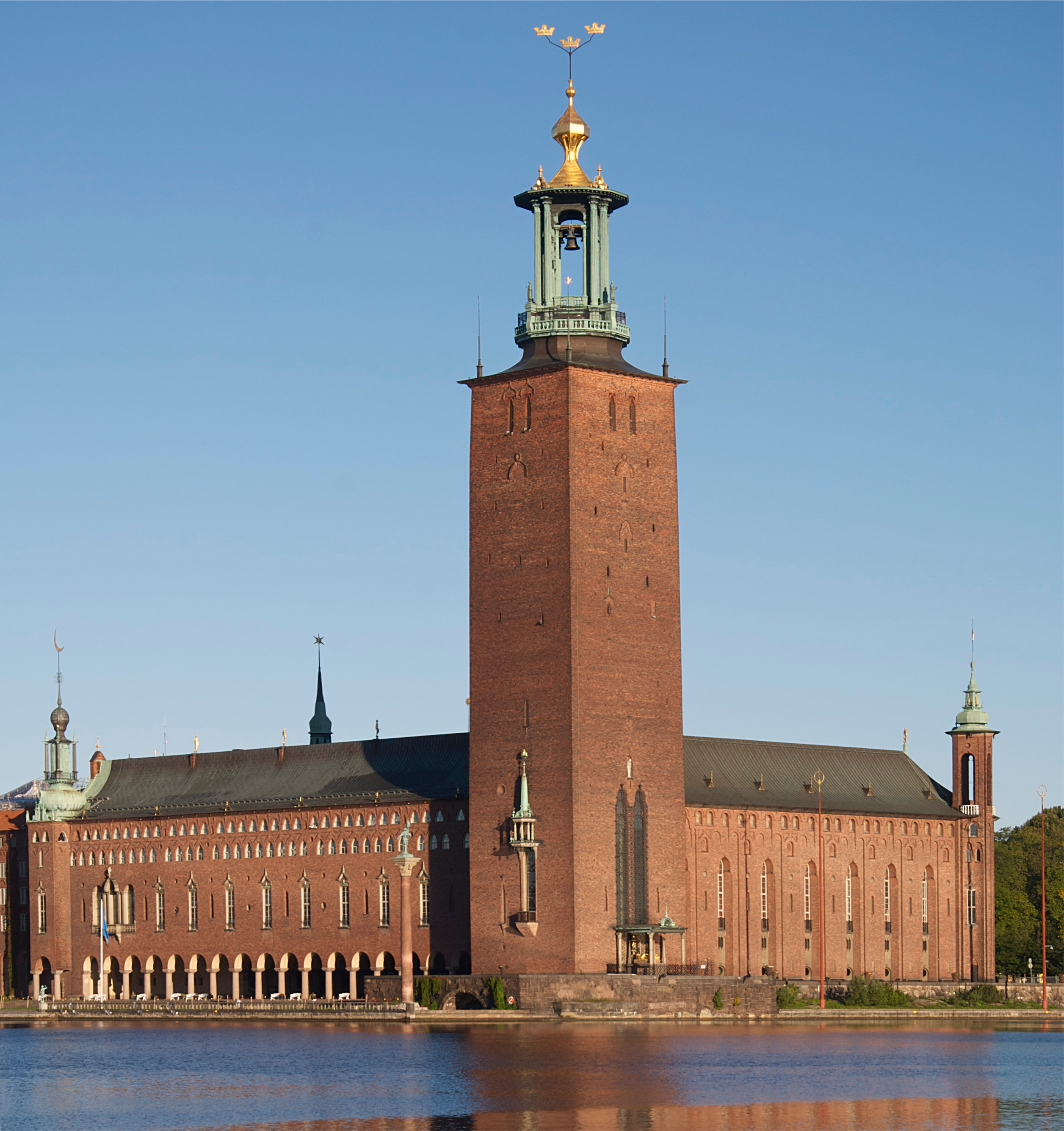
Stockholm City Hall, Sweden

=== Buildings opened ===
- June 23 – Stockholm City Hall, designed by Ragnar Östberg.
- December 26 – Ottawa Auditorium, Canada (demolished 1967).

=== Buildings completed ===
- Coedfa (residence), The Close, Llanfairfechan, North Wales, designed by Herbert Luck North.
- Imperial Hotel, Tokyo, designed by Frank Lloyd Wright.
- Église Notre-Dame du Raincy in France, designed by Auguste Perret.
- Pershing Square Building in New York, New York, designed by Sloan & Robertson and York and Sawyer.

== Awards ==
- AIA Gold Medal – Henry Bacon
- RIBA Royal Gold Medal – John James Burnet
- Grand Prix de Rome, architecture: Jean-Baptiste Mathon

== Births ==
- March 2 – Sam Scorer, English architect (died 2003)
- June 5 – Yona Friedman, Hungarian born French architect and architectural theorist ("mobile architecture") (died 2020)
- June 24 – Peter Womersley, British architect (died 1993)
- June 25 – Harry Seidler, Austrian-born Australian Modernist architect (died 2006)
- September 18 – Peter Smithson, English New Brutalist architect, husband and partner of Alison Smithson (died 2003)
- September 25 – Leonardo Benevolo, Italian historian of modern architecture (died 2017)
- December 12 – Richard Gilbert Scott, English architect (died 2017)
- December 19 – Alexander Cvijanović, Yugoslav/American architect (died 2019)
- December 25 – Jack Zunz, South African-born structural engineer (died 2018)
- Eulie Chowdhury, Indian architect (died 1995)

== Deaths ==
- May 19 – Frank Darling, Canadian architect and promoter of the Beaux-Arts style (born 1850)
- October 25 – Robert S. Roeschlaub, Colorado architect (born 1843)
- November 24 – Michel de Klerk, Dutch Amsterdam School architect (born 1884)
- December 27 – Gustave Eiffel, French civil engineer and architect (born 1832)
