= 1856 in architecture =

The following architectural events occurred in the year 1856.

== Buildings and structures ==
=== Buildings opened ===
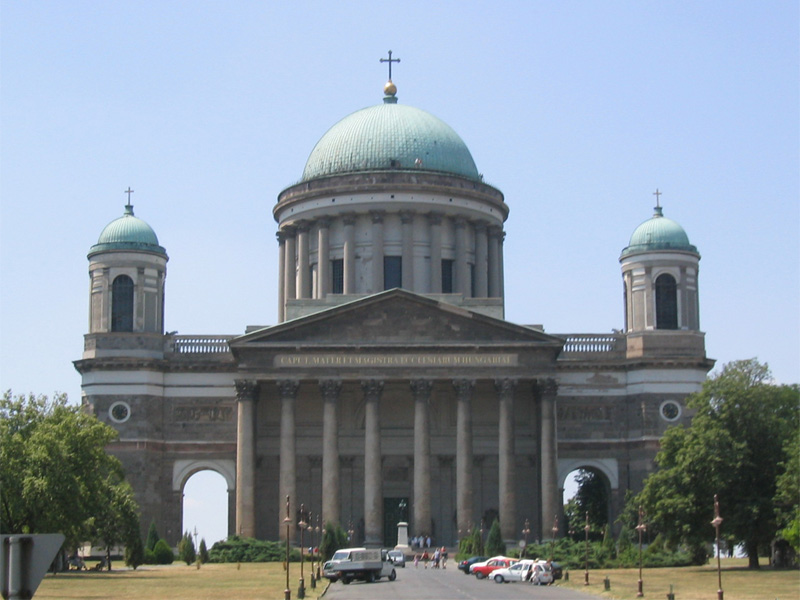
Esztergom Basilica, Hungary

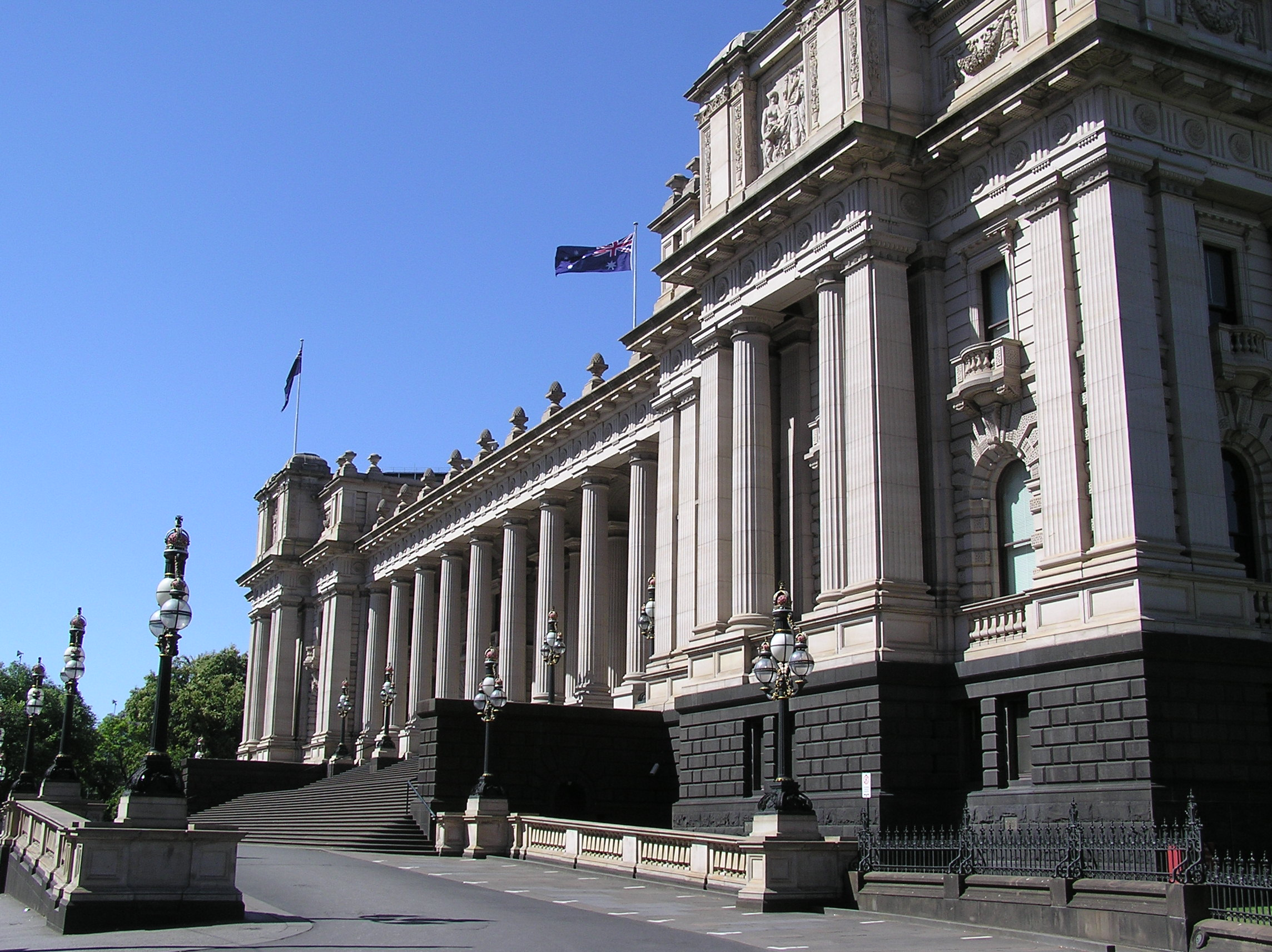
The Parliament House, Melbourne, Australia

- February – State Library of Victoria in Melbourne, Australia, designed by Joseph Reed
- May 15 – Rumeli Feneri, Istanbul, Turkey
- August 31 – The Esztergom Basilica in Hungary, designed by Pál Kühnel and József Hild (consecrated)
- October 4 – Lindau Lighthouse, Bavaria
- November 1 – Stamford Water Street railway station in Lincolnshire, England, designed by William Hurst

=== Buildings completed ===
- Debating chambers of Parliament House, Melbourne, Australia, designed by General Charles Pasley
- Dolmabahçe Palace in Istanbul, Turkey.
- Landherrnamt, Bremen, Germany, designed by Alexander Schröder in the Neo-Romanesque style
- Walnut Hall, Toronto, Canada, designed by John Tully as O'Donohoe Row (demolished 2007)

== Events ==
- Future English novelist and poet Thomas Hardy is apprenticed to architect James Hicks in Dorchester, Dorset.

== Awards ==
- RIBA Royal Gold Medal – William Tite.
- Grand Prix de Rome, architecture: Edmond Guillaume.

== Births ==
- January 7 – Sydney Mitchell, Scottish architect (died 1930)
- January 21 – Gustaf Nyström, Finnish architect (died 1917)
- February 12 – Hendrik Petrus Berlage, Dutch architect (died 1934)
- August 5 – Axel Berg, Danish architect (died 1929)
- September 3 – Louis Sullivan, American architect, "father of skyscrapers" (died 1924)
- September 23 – John Bilson, English architect and architectural historian (died 1943)
- October 30 – Edward Prioleau Warren, English architect (died 1937)
- December 20 – Reginald Blomfield, English architect (died 1942)
- date unknown – Eugène Vallin, French architect, furniture designer and manufacturer (died 1922)

== Deaths ==
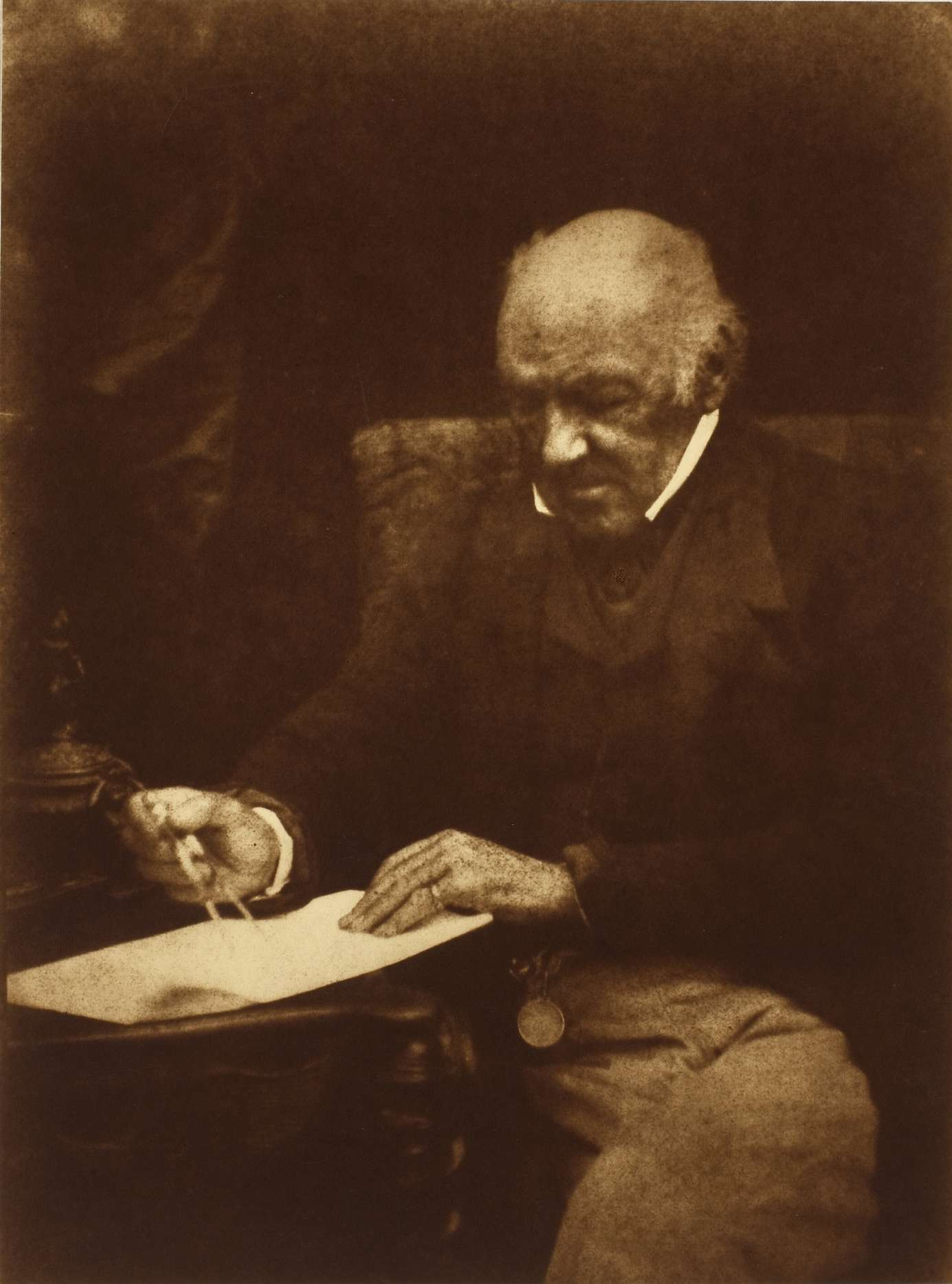
Robert Reid

- March 20 – Robert Reid, King's architect and surveyor for Scotland from 1827 to 1839 (born 1774)
- March 27 – David Laing, British architect (born 1774)
