= 1774 in architecture =

The year 1774 in architecture involved some significant events.

== Buildings and structures ==
=== Buildings ===
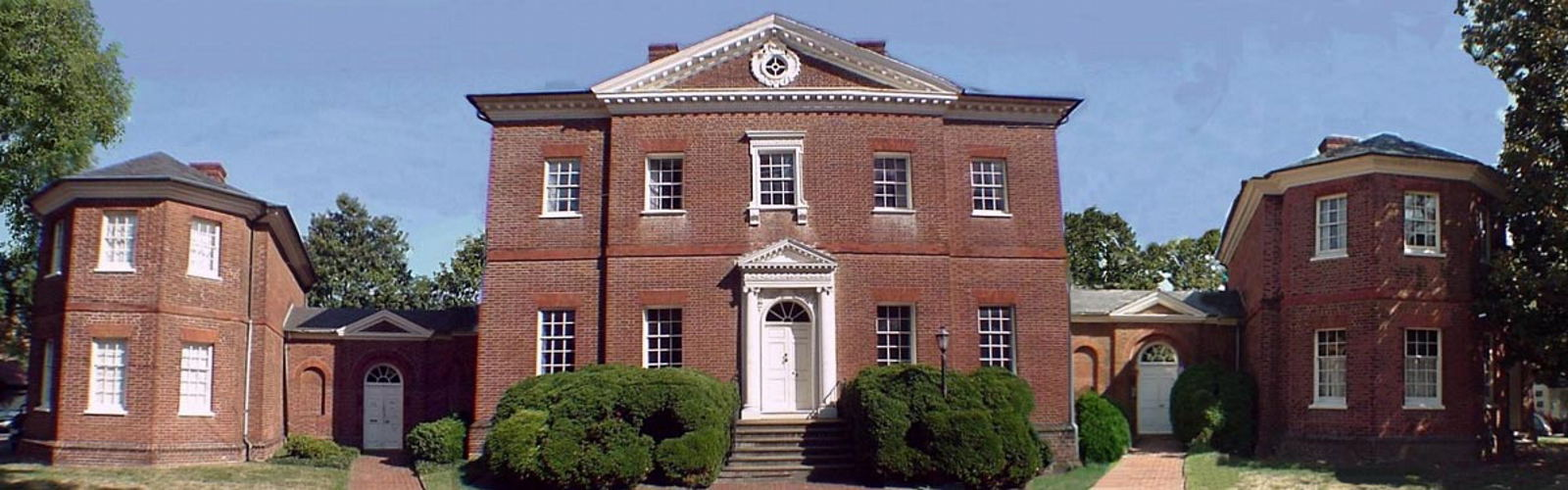
Hammond-Harwood House, Annapolis, Maryland

- Hammond-Harwood House in Annapolis, Maryland, designed by William Buckland is begun and largely completed before the architect's death, the only surviving example of American colonial architecture based on a design by Palladio.
- Original construction of Château de Bénouville in Normandy, designed by Claude Nicolas Ledoux is completed.
- Royal Crescent in Bath, England, designed by John Wood, the Younger is completed.
- Dundas House in New Town, Edinburgh, Scotland, designed by William Chambers, is completed.
- Gatcombe Park in Gloucestershire, England is completed (much later and after reconstruction the private country home of Anne, Princess Royal).
- Clifton House, Belfast in the north of Ireland, a poorhouse designed by Mr Cooley, is opened.
- Włodawa Synagogue in Poland is completed.
- Basilica church of Santissima Annunziata Maggiore, Naples, designed by Luigi Vanvitelli and completed by his son Carlo, is consecrated.
- Ermita de Santa Ana overlooking Chiclana de la Frontera in the Spanish province of Cádiz, designed by Torcuato Cayón, is completed.
- Monastery of San Francisco, Lima, Peru, consecrated in 1673, is completed.
- Construction of Real Felipe Fortress at Callao near Lima, Peru, begun to the design of Louis Godin in 1747, is concluded.
- Vaults and choir of Vannes Cathedral in Brittany are completed.
- English Bridge over the River Severn in Shrewsbury, England, designed by John Gwynn, is completed.
- Marble Bridge at Tsarskoye Selo in Russia is erected.
- Work ceases on the Palace of Versailles in France.
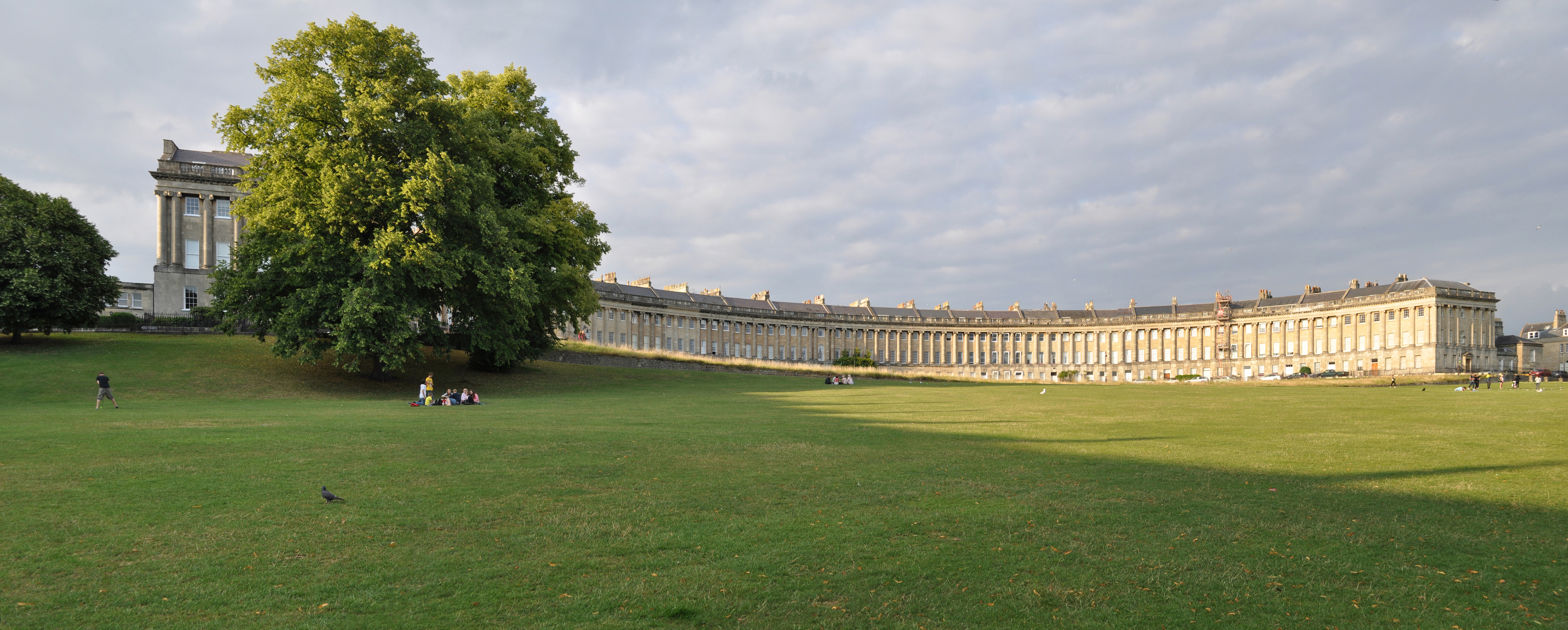
Royal Crescent, Bath

== Births ==
- April 29 – David Hoadley, American architect (died 1839)
- November 8 – Robert Reid, Scottish royal architect (died 1856)
- Late(?) – David Laing, English architect (died 1856)
- James O'Donnell, Anglo-Irish architect working in North America (died 1830)
- 1774/5 – William Atkinson, English Gothic country house architect (died 1839)

== Deaths ==
- January 9 – Jacques-François Blondel, French architect and teacher (born 1705)
- January 28 – Antonio Galli Bibiena, Italian architect (born 1700)
- June 20 – Joshua Kirby, English landscape painter, engraver, writer, topographical draughtsman and architect (born 1716)
- October 15 – Prince Dmitry Ukhtomsky, chief architect of Moscow (born 1719)
- November/December – William Buckland, English-born architect in the American colonies (born 1734)
- Francesco Maria Preti, Italian Baroque architect (born 1701)
