= 2022 in architecture =

The year 2022 in architecture involved some significant architectural events and new buildings.

== Events ==
- 1 March - Russian shelling of Freedom Square in Kharkiv severely damages the Regional State Administration Building and more heritage listed buildings.
- 16 March - Shelling in Mariupol destroys Donetsk Regional Drama Theatre.
- 8 October - Crimean Bridge between Crimea and Russia, the longest bridge in Europe, the road section of the bridge collapsed due to explosion.

== Buildings and structures ==
India

- The Statue of Belief (Vishwas Swaroopam), depicting Shiva opens on 29 October in Rajasthan.

Spain

- Biblioteca Gabriel García Márquez in Barcelona, designed by Suma Arquitectura, is formally inaugurated on 28 May.

Taiwan

- Taipei Performing Arts Center, designed by Rem Koolhaas and David Gianotten at Office for Metropolitan Architecture, opens officially on 7 August.

Turkey

- 1915 Çanakkale Bridge, the longest suspension bridge in the world, is completed.

United Arab Emirates

Museum of the Future in Dubai

- The Museum of the Future designed by Killa Design architecture studio and engineered by Buro Happold opened to public on 22 February in Dubai.

United States

- The Mies Building for the Eskenazi School of Art, Architecture + Design at Indiana University Bloomington is completed based largely on a 1952 design by Mies van der Rohe.

== Awards ==
- AIA Gold Medal – Angela Brooks and Lawrence Scarpa
- Driehaus Architecture Prize for New Classical Architecture – Rob Krier
- Pritzker Architecture Prize – Diébédo Francis Kéré
- RIBA Royal Gold Medal – B. V. Doshi
- RAIA Gold Medal – Sean Godsell
- Stirling Prize – The New Library, Magdalene College, Cambridge

Upcoming

- European Union Prize for Contemporary Architecture (Mies van der Rohe Prize) – (announced end April)
- Aga Khan Award for Architecture – (announced autumn)

== Exhibitions ==
- 6 Feb - 2 July: MoMA New York: "The Project of Independence: Architectures of Decolonization in South Asia, 1947–1985", curated by Martino Stierli and Anoma Pieris.

== Deaths ==
- January 11 - Eberhard Zeidler, 95, German-born Canadian architect (Eaton Centre) (b. 1926)
- January 14 - Ricardo Bofill, 82, Spanish architect (b. 1939)
- March 17 - Christopher Alexander, 85, Austrian born British-American architect and design theorist (b. 1936)
- March 24 - John Andrews, 88, Australian architect (b. 1933)
- August 9 - Miles Warren, 93, New Zealand architect (b. 1929)
- August 16
  - Mark Girouard, 90, English architectural writer and historian (b. 1931)
  - John Rauch, 91, American architect (b. 1930)
- August 23 - José Vivas, 94, Venezuelan architect (b. 1928)
- September 9 - James Polshek, 92, American architect (Clinton Presidential Center, the Brooklyn Museum) (b. 1930)
- September 17 - Vlado Milunić, 81, Croatian-Czech architect (Dancing House) (b. 1941)
- October 14 - Étienne Gaboury, 92, Canadian architect (Royal Canadian Mint- Winnipeg, Saint Boniface Cathedral, Esplanade Riel) (b. 1930)
- October 20 - Blanche Lemco van Ginkel, 98, British-born Canadian architect and city planner (Expo 67) (b. 1923)
- November 10 - Agustín Hernández Navarro, 98, Mexican architect (b. 1924)
- December 29 - Arata Isozaki, 91, Japanese architect (Kitakyushu Municipal Museum of Art, MOCA, Nagi Museum Of Contemporary Art), Pritzker Prize winner (2019) (b. 1931)

== See also ==
- Timeline of architecture
