= 2002 in architecture =

The year 2002 in architecture involved some significant architectural events and new buildings.

== Events ==
- Office Kersten Geers David Van Severen established in Brussels.

== Buildings and structures ==
=== Buildings opened ===
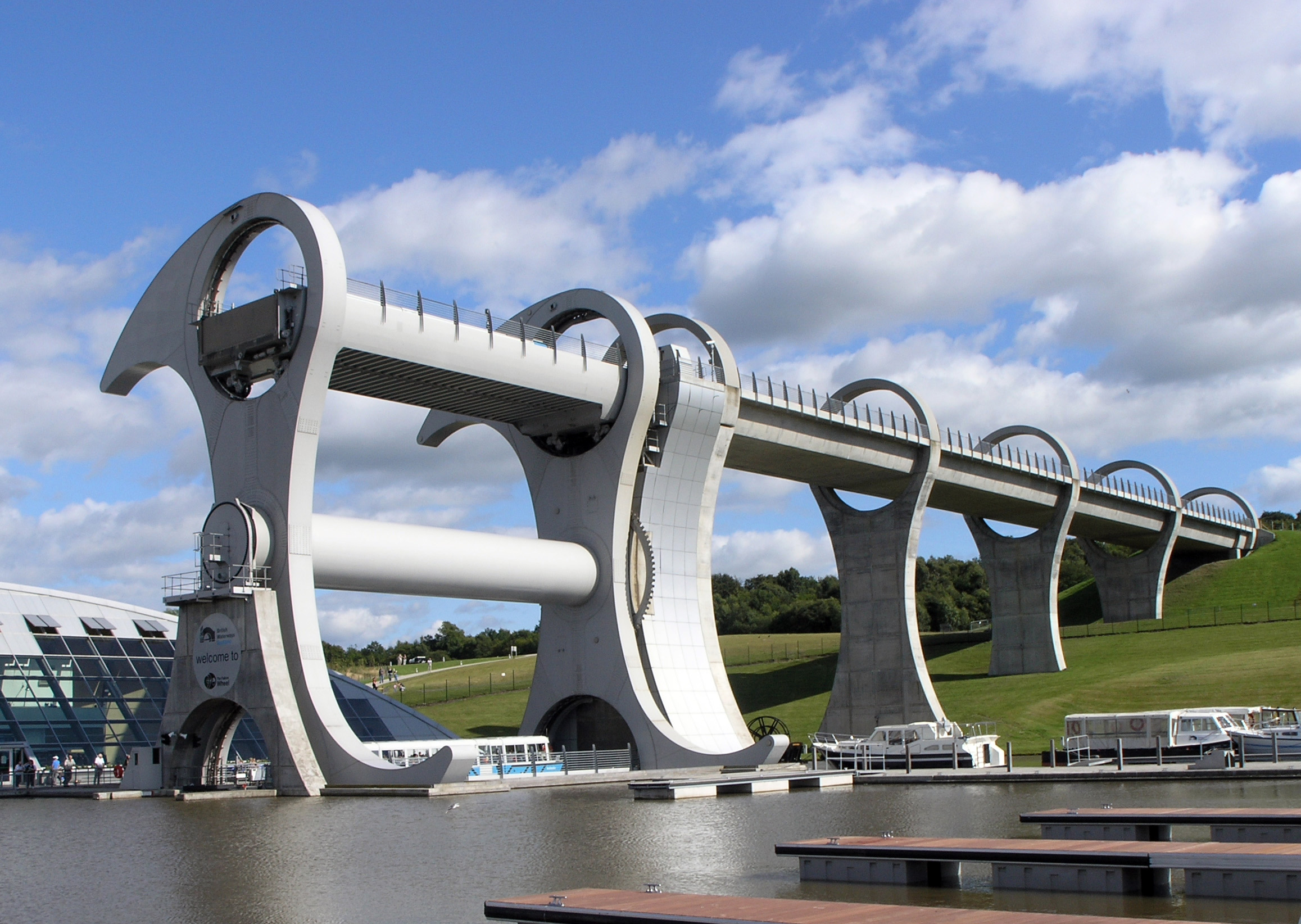
The Falkirk Wheel near Falkirk, Scotland

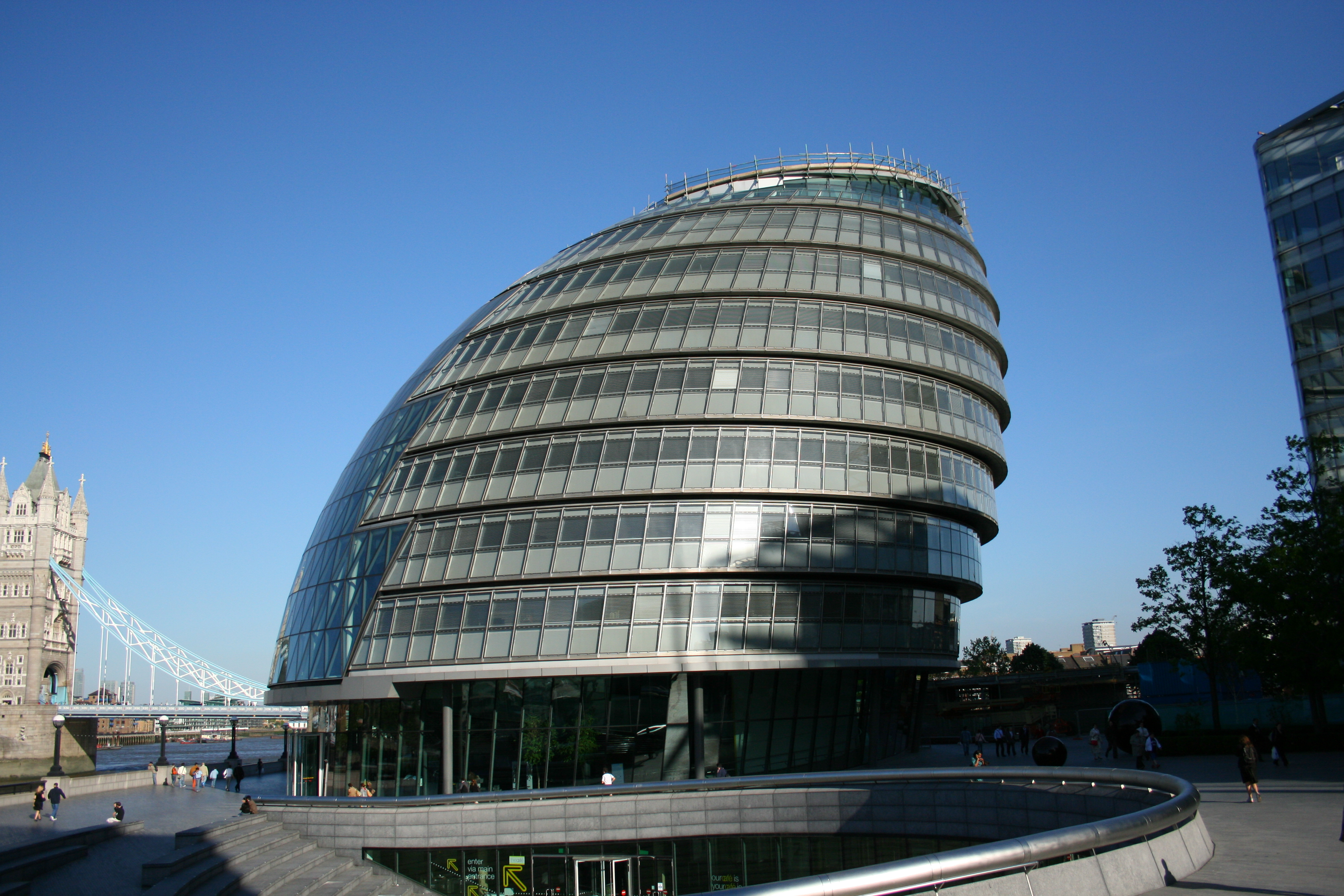
City Hall in London, England

- May 21 – Portico and extensions to the Queen's Gallery at Buckingham Palace, London, designed by John Simpson, are opened by Queen Elizabeth II of the United Kingdom as part of her Golden Jubilee.
- May 24 – The Falkirk Wheel, a rotating boat lift, connecting the Forth and Clyde Canal with the Union Canal, near Falkirk, Scotland, is opened by Queen Elizabeth II of the United Kingdom as part of her Golden Jubilee.
- July – London City Hall on the south bank of the River Thames, designed by Norman Foster.
- July 5 – The Imperial War Museum North in Manchester, UK, designed by Daniel Libeskind.
- July 13 – Baltic Centre for Contemporary Art, converted from the Baltic Flour Mill at Gateshead in North East England, UK.
- September 2 – Cathedral of Our Lady of the Angels, designed by José Rafael Moneo, is consecrated in Los Angeles, California, USA.
- September 22 - Vassenden Church, Sogn og Fjordane county, Norway, designed by Per W. Skarstein, is consecrated.
- October 16 – Bibliotheca Alexandrina inaugurated in Alexandria, Egypt, from the competition winning entry by Snøhetta.
- October 26 – Federation Square in Melbourne, Australia.,
- December 14 – Modern Art Museum of Fort Worth in Texas, USA, designed by Tadao Ando.
- date unknown
  - 383 Madison Avenue opens in New York City, USA, designed by David Childs and used as the Bear Stearns office building.
  - Laban dance centre, designed by Herzog & de Meuron (Stirling Prize 2003), in Deptford, London, UK.
  - The Deep aquarium, designed by Sir Terry Farrell, in Hull, UK.

=== Buildings completed ===
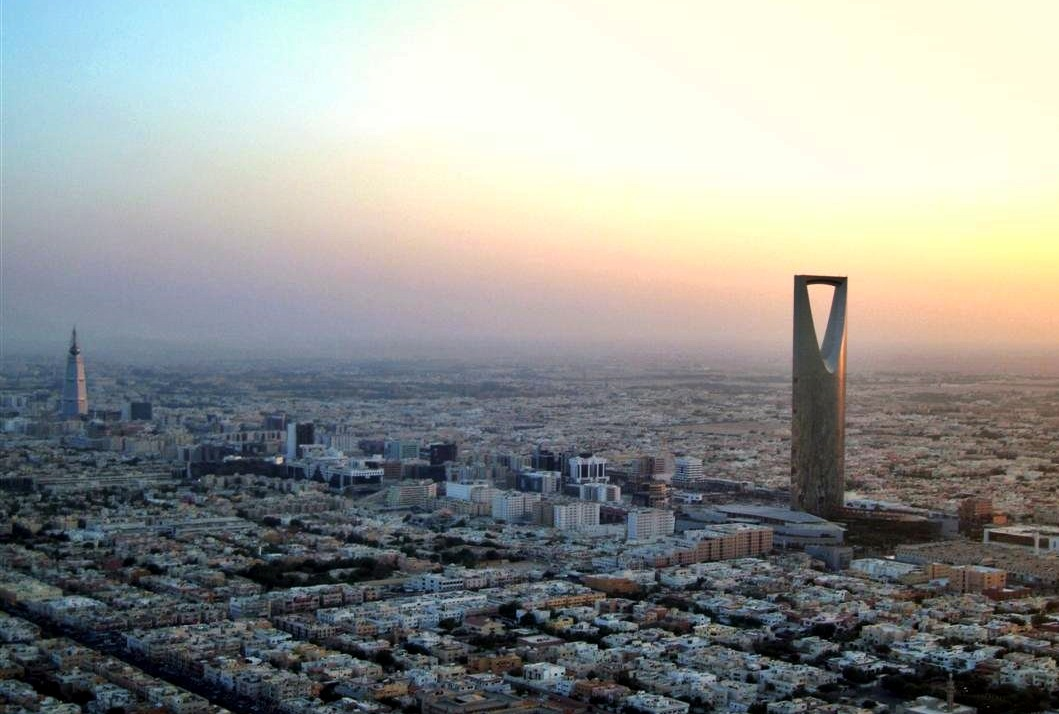
The Kingdom Centre in Riyadh, Saudi Arabia

- specific date not listed:
  - Kingdom Centre in Riyadh, Saudi Arabia, designed by Ellerbe Becket and Omrania and Associates.
  - Peter B. Lewis Building, designed by Frank Gehry for Weatherhead School of Management, Case Western Reserve University, Cleveland, Ohio.
  - Beddington Zero Energy Development (BedZED), designed by Bill Dunster, in Beddington, London, UK.
  - "Dirty House", designed by David Adjaye, in the London Borough of Hackney, UK.
  - Hampden Gurney Church of England Primary School, designed by Building Design Partnership, in Marylebone, London, UK.
  - Weald and Downland Gridshell, designed by Edward Cullinan Architects, in Southern England, UK.
  - Extension to Horniman Museum, London, designed by Allies and Morrison.
  - Metropolitan Cathedral of the Immaculate Conception, Zamboanga, designed by designed by Abarro and Associates, in the Philippines.
  - Restoration and extension of Church of the Good Shepherd, Pakila, designed by Juha Leiviskä and Vilhelm Helander, in Helsinki, Finland.

== Awards ==
- American Academy of Arts and Letters Gold Medal – Frank Gehry
- AIA Gold Medal – Tadao Ando
- Architecture Firm Award – Thompson, Ventulett, Stainback & Associates
- Emporis Skyscraper Award – Kingdom Centre
- Grand Prix de l'urbanisme – Bruno Fortier
- Praemium Imperiale Architecture Laureate – Norman Foster
- Pritzker Prize – Glenn Murcutt
- Prix de l'Équerre d'Argent – Pierre du Besset and Dominique Lyon for Troyes Library
- RIAS Award for Architecture – Malcolm Fraser Architects for Dance Base, Edinburgh
- RAIA Gold Medal – Brit Andresen
- RIBA Royal Gold Medal – Archigram
- Stirling Prize – Wilkinson Eyre Architects & Gifford for Gateshead Millennium Bridge
- Thomas Jefferson Medal in Architecture – James Turrell
- Twenty-five Year Award – Fundació Joan Miró
- UIA Gold Medal – Renzo Piano
- Vincent Scully Prize – Robert Venturi and Denise Scott-Brown

== Deaths ==
- August 21 – Benjamin C. Thompson, US architect (born 1918)
- September 13 – Richard Foster, US Modernist architect
- October 27 – Valve Pormeister, Estonian architect (born 1922)

== See also ==
- Timeline of architecture
