= 1931 in architecture =

The year 1931 in architecture involved some significant events.

== Events ==
- January 18 – The New York Times announces the arrival of the "photo-mural" for interior design. It is also promoted for use by architectural designer Le Corbusier. Already in use since at least 1927 before it reached mainstream popularity, the new medium is embraced by architects in the 1930s.
- December 5 – The Cathedral of Christ the Saviour in Moscow (1883) is dynamited.
- The first of the Architects (Registration) Acts is passed in the United Kingdom.
- The first of the historic districts in the United States is designated in Charleston, South Carolina, by the city government.

== Buildings and structures ==
=== Buildings ===
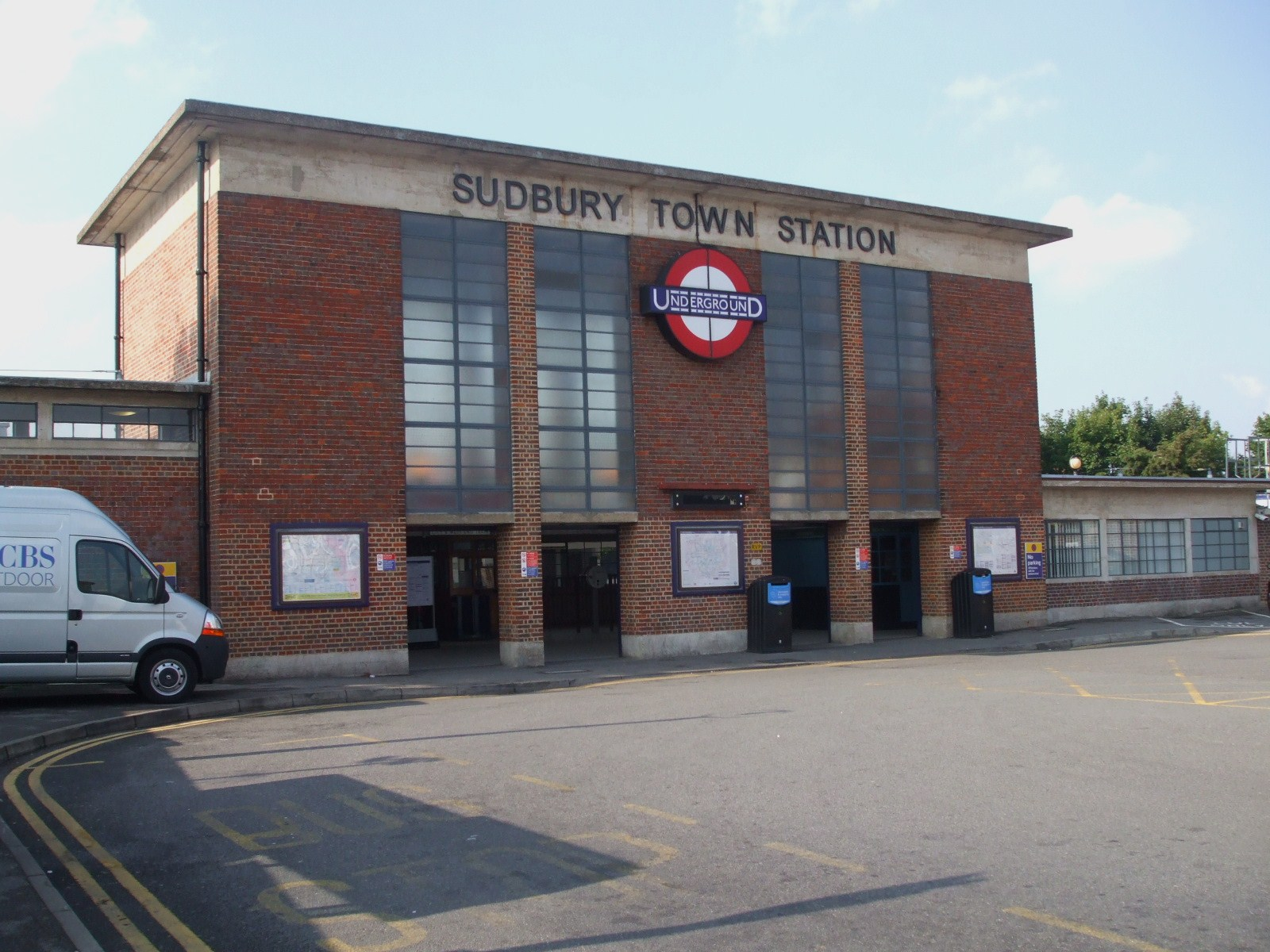
Sudbury Town Station in London, England

Villa Savoye in Paris, France

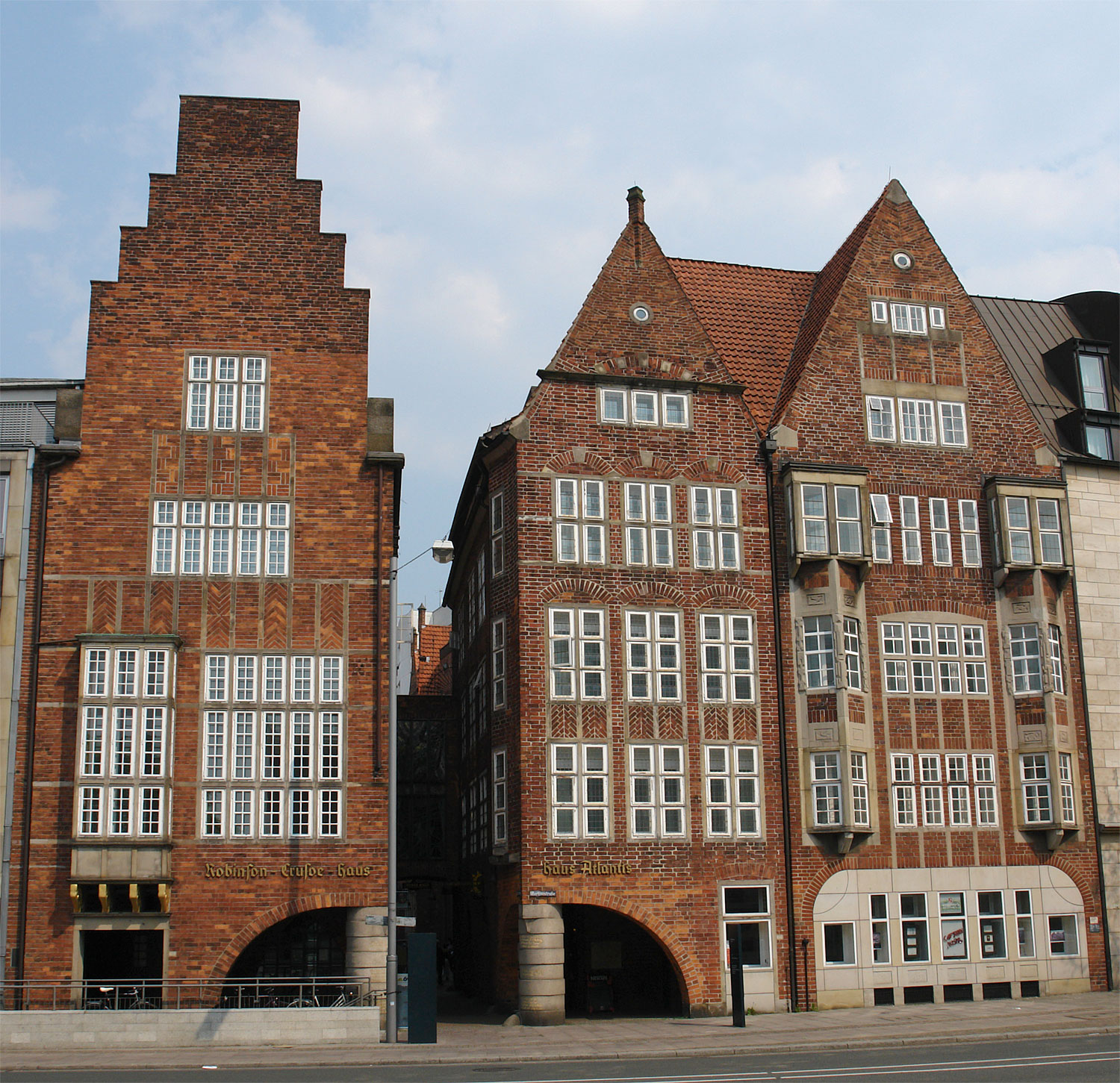
Robinson Crusoe House and Atlantis House on Böttcherstraße in Bremen, Germany

- January 22 – Haus des Rundfunks in Berlin, designed by Hans Poelzig, inaugurated as headquarters of German national broadcaster Reichs-Rundfunk-Gesellschaft.
- January 23 – Viceroy's House, New Delhi, India, designed by Sir Edwin Lutyens, first occupied.
- May 1 – The Empire State Building is completed in New York City as the tallest building in the world.
- July 1 – The rebuilt Milano Centrale railway station opens in Italy.
- July 19 – Sudbury Town station on the London Underground Piccadilly line opens as rebuilt by Charles Holden, the first of his iconic modern designs for the network.
- July – Royal Corinthian Yacht Club clubhouse, Burnham-on-Crouch, eastern England, designed by Joseph Emberton, is opened.
- 21 West Street in New York City, designed by Starrett & van Vleck, completed.
- Villa Savoye in Paris, designed by Le Corbusier and his cousin, Pierre Jeanneret, using reinforced concrete and demonstrating Le Corbusier's Five Points of Architecture, is completed.
- Commerce Court North is completed in Toronto, Ontario and becomes the tallest building in the British Empire (1931–1962).
- George Washington Bridge the longest suspension bridge in the world by the length of central span (1931–1937), is completed.
- St Olaf House (Hay's Wharf head offices), Tooley Street, London Borough of Southwark, designed by H. S. Goodhart-Rendel.
- Raleigh Bicycle Company head offices in Nottingham, England, designed by Thomas Cecil Howitt, completed.
- Aiton & Co. factory office, Derby, England, designed by Norah Aiton and Betty Scott, completed.
- India Tyres offices at Inchinnan, Scotland, designed by Thomas Wallis of Wallis, Gilbert and Partners, completed and opened.
- Atlantis House and Robinson Crusoe House in Böttcherstraße, Bremen, designed by Bernhard Hoetger, complete the street's construction in the style of Brick Expressionism.
- City Hall, Hilversum, North Holland, designed by Willem Marinus Dudok, is completed.
- India Gate in New Delhi is completed.
- Student Union at the Royal Institute of Technology, Stockholm, designed by Sven Markelius and Uno Åhrén.
- South Houses, California Institute of Technology, Pasadena, designed by Gordon Kaufmann.
- Washington Singer Building on the Streatham Campus of the University of Exeter in England, designed by Vincent Harris.
- New Synagogue, Žilina, Czechoslovakia, designed by Peter Behrens, is completed.
- High and Over, Amersham, one of the first modernist houses in England, designed by Amyas Connell, is completed.
- House for two brothers in Brno, designed by Otto Eisler, is completed.
- Apartment Building at 342, Muntaner Street, Barcelona, designed by Josep Lluís Sert, is completed.
- The Home Insurance Building in Chicago, Illinois is demolished.
- Stella Maris on the island of Norderney by Dominikus Böhm is completed

== Awards ==
- RIBA Royal Gold Medal – Edwin Cooper.
- Grand Prix de Rome, architecture: Georges Dengler.

== Births ==
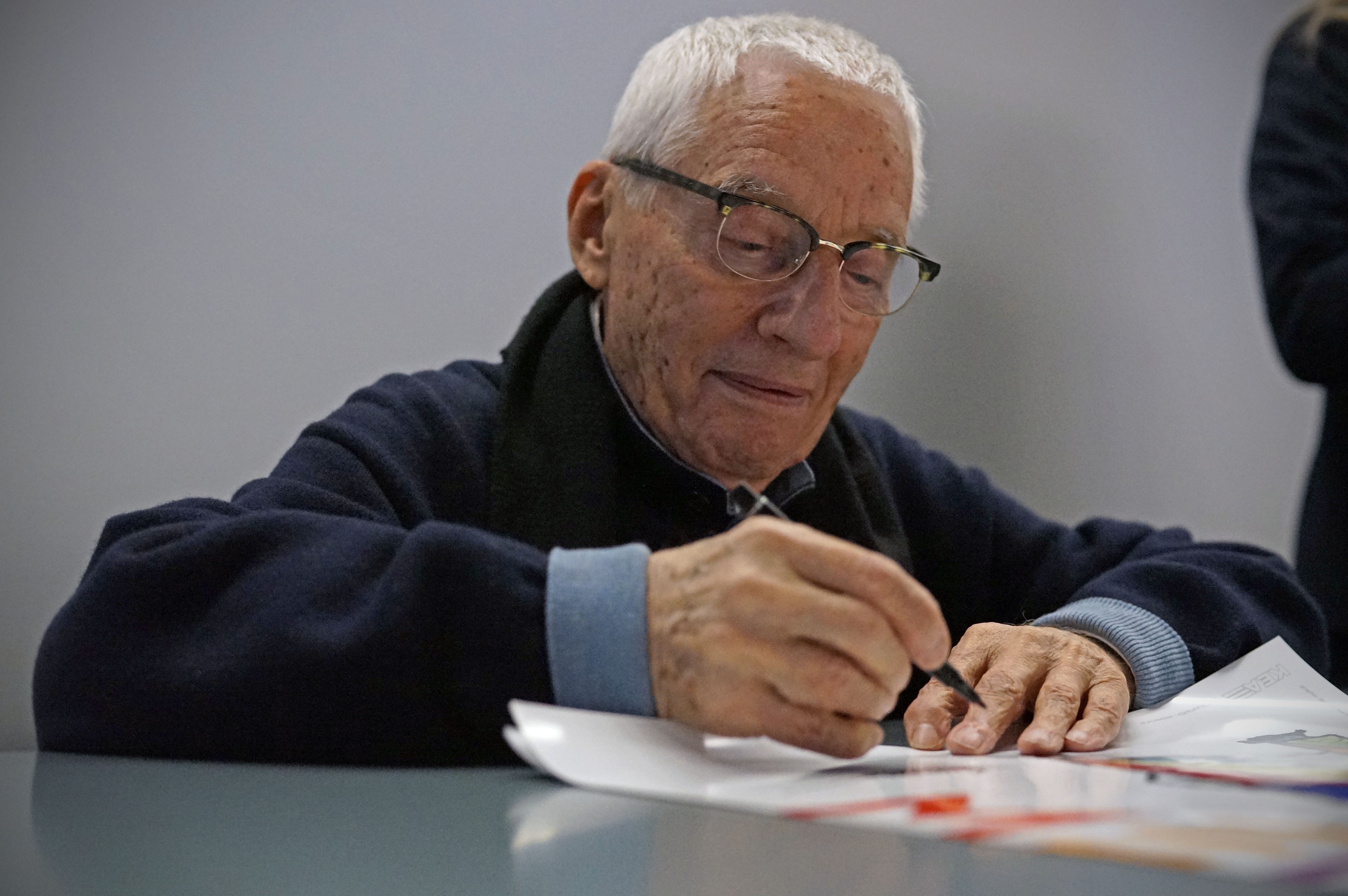
Alessandro Mendini

- April 23 – Roland Paoletti, British architect (died 2013)
- May 3 – Aldo Rossi, Italian architect and designer (died 1997)
- May 7 – Ricardo Legorreta, Mexican architect (died 2011)
- May 29 – Mario Maioli, Italian architect and painter
- July 17 – Edward Cullinan, English architect (died 2019)
- July 23 – Arata Isozaki, Japanese architect (died 2022)
- August 16 – Alessandro Mendini, Italian architect and designer (died 2019)
- October 3 – Denise Scott Brown, Rhodesian-born American architect
- October 7 – Mark Girouard, English architectural writer and historian (died 2022)

== Deaths ==
- March 7 – Theo van Doesburg, Dutch polymath, leader of De Stijl (born 1883)
- July 17 – William Lethaby, English Arts and Crafts architect and designer (born 1857)
- September 1 – Nahum Barnet, Melbourne-based Australian architect (born 1855)
- September 20 – Max Littmann, German architect (born 1862)
- December 3 – Frederick Walters, Scottish architect of the Victorian and Edwardian eras, notable for his Roman Catholic churches (born 1849)
