= 1930 in architecture =

The year 1930 in architecture involved some significant events.

== Events ==
- May–September – Stockholm Exhibition (Stockholmsutställningen) staged by the city of Stockholm and the Svenska Slöjdföreningen ("Swedish Society of Craft and Design") under the leadership of Gregor Paulsson in the Djurgården, showcasing Functionalism (Funkis) and the International Style. The lead architects are Gunnar Asplund (who designs the Paradiset restaurant) and Sigurd Lewerentz (who also this year designs a warehouse for Philips in the city); architects involved in the housing exhibition include Sven Markelius, Paul Hedqvist, Nils Ahrbom, Helge Zimdal and Uno Åhrén.
- Vanessa Bell and Duncan Grant complete the decoration of the dining room for Dorothy Wellesley at Penns-in-the-Rocks, Withyham, England.
- John Betjeman is given an editorial post on the Architectural Review (London).

== Buildings and structures ==
=== Opened ===
- February 22 – Loew's 175th Street Theatre on Manhattan, designed by Thomas W. Lamb with interiors by the Rambusch Decorating Company.
- March 22 – Le Touret Memorial, France.
- April 8 – Brisbane City Hall, Brisbane, Australia.
- June 9 – The Chicago Board of Trade Building, designed by Holabird & Roche.
- June 17 – Erphokirche in Münster, designed by Carl Moritz.
- June 21 – Hus' House (Vršovice) church and community centre in Prague, designed by Karel Truksa and Pavel Janák.
- August 18 – Salginatobel Bridge in Switzerland, designed by Robert Maillart.

=== Completed ===
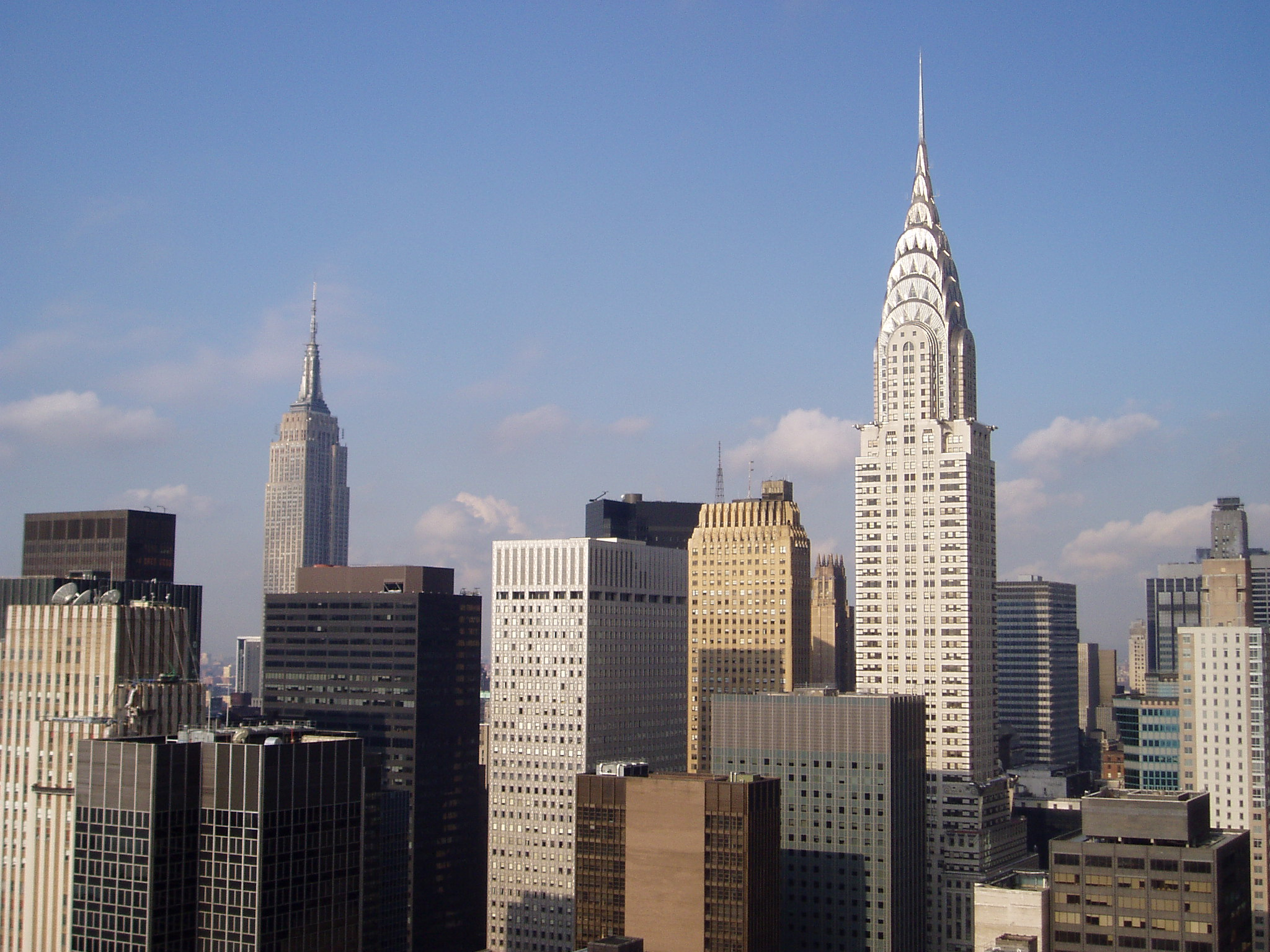
The Chrysler Building in New York City, USA

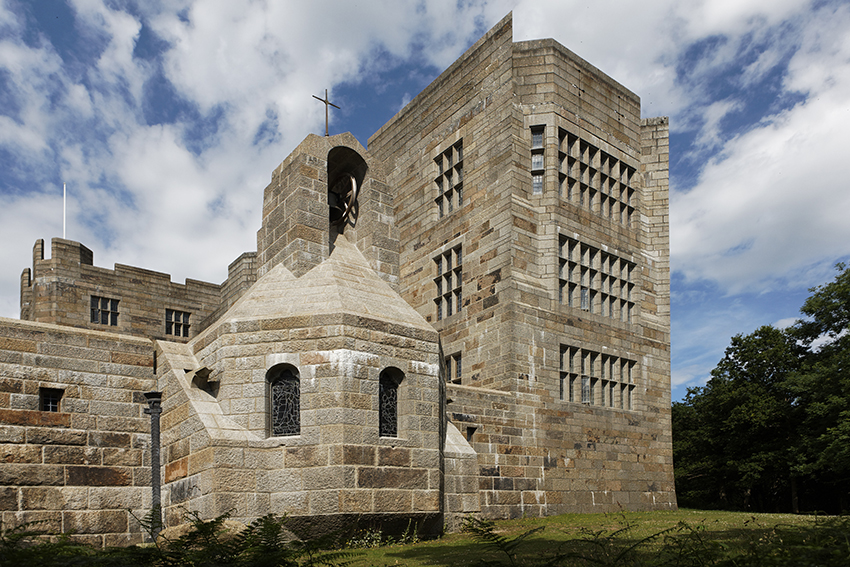
Castle Drogo in Devon, England

- April – 40 Wall Street (at this time the Bank of Manhattan Trust Building), briefly the tallest building in the world.
- May 20 – Chrysler Building in New York, designed by William van Alen, succeeds the Bank of Manhattan Trust Building as the tallest building in the world and the Eiffel Tower as the tallest structure. It remains the world's tallest steel-supported brick building.
- July 3 – Grace Building, Sydney, Australia.
- Guenete Leul Palace, Addis Ababa, Ethiopia, built for Emperor Haile Selassie.
- Palazzo Gualino, Turin, Italy, designed by Giuseppe Pagano and Gino Levi-Montalcini.
- IG Farben Building, Frankfurt am Main, Germany.
- Crawford's Advertising Agency, 233 High Holborn, London, designed by Frederick Etchells with Herbert A. Welch.
- Thames House on Millbank, Westminster, London, designed by Frank Baines.
- Station reconstructions on Berlin U-Bahn, designed by Alfred Grenander.
- Hufeisensiedlung (Horseshoe estate), one of the Berlin Modernism Housing Estates in Weimar Germany, designed by Bruno Taut and Martin Wagner.
- Karl-Marx-Hof in Vienna, designed by Karl Ehn, opens, a half-mile-wide (1100 m) apartment building.
- The Terminal Tower complex in Cleveland, designed by Graham, Anderson, Probst, and White.
- Apartments for social housing in Page Street, Westminster, designed by Sir Edwin Lutyens.
- Castle Drogo, a country house in Devon, England designed by Edwin Lutyens.
- Chachmei Lublin Yeshiva in Lublin, Poland.
- Villa Tugendhat in Brno, Czechoslovakia, designed by Ludwig Mies van der Rohe.

== Awards ==
- American Academy of Arts and Letters Gold Medal – Charles A. Platt.
- RIBA Royal Gold Medal – Percy Scott Worthington.

== Births ==
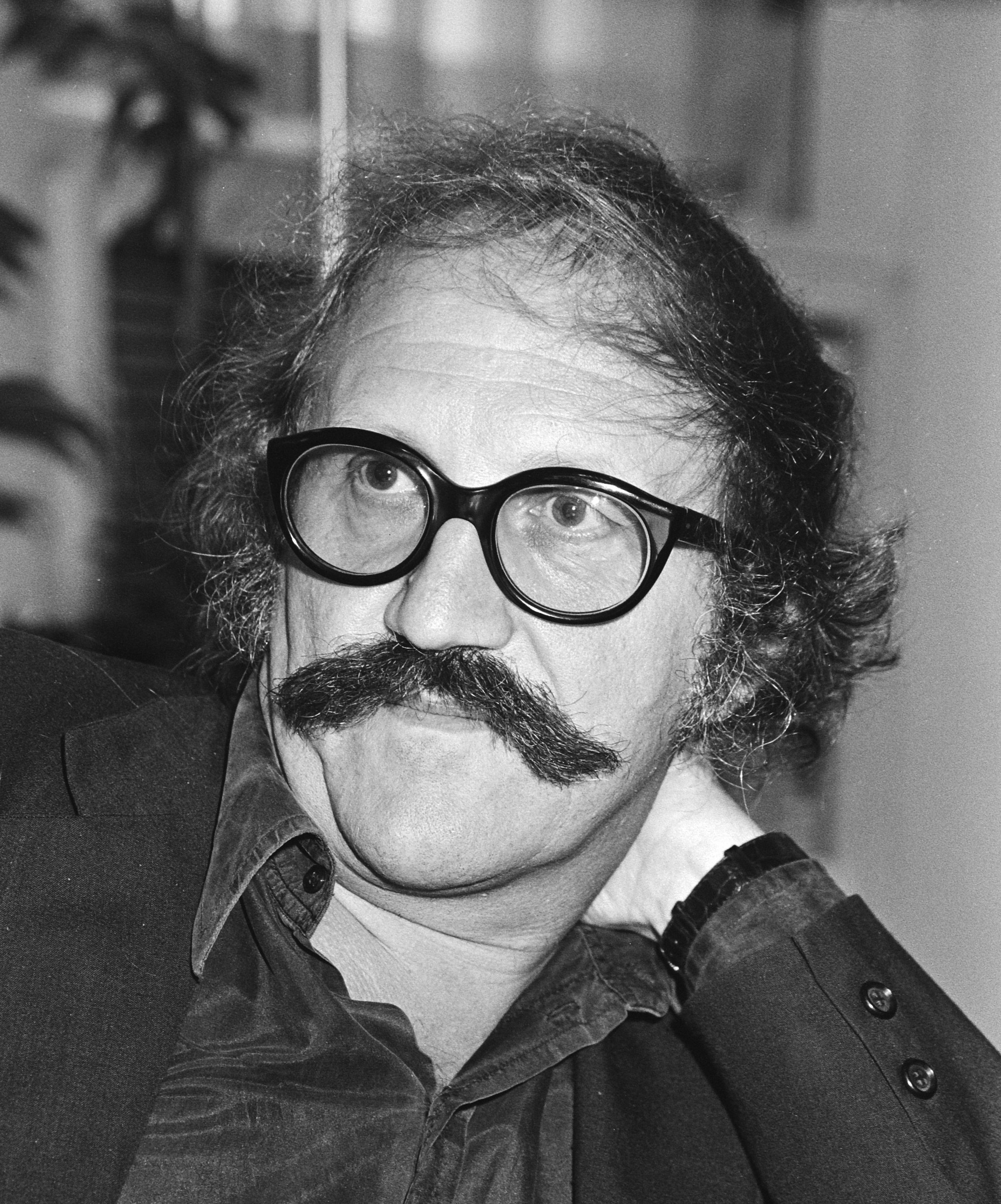
Wilhelm Holzbauer

- June 16 – Manfredi Nicoletti, Italian architect, pioneer of urban ecosystems (d. 2017)
- June 29 – Jan Hoogstad, Dutch architect (d. 2018)
- August 21 – Eva Vecsei, Hungarian-Canadian architect
- September 1 – Charles Correa, Indian architect, planner and activist (d. 2015)
- September 3 - Wilhelm Holzbauer, Austrian architecture (d. 2019)
- September 20 - Stanley Tigerman, American architect, theorist, and designer (d. 2019)
- October 23 – John Rauch, American architect (d. 2022)

== Deaths ==
- April 12 – Karl Lindahl, Finnish architect (born 1874)
- June 18 – Vladimir Vladimirovich Sherwood, Russian architect (born 1867)
- August 21 – Sir Aston Webb, English architect (born 1849)
- October 13 – Sydney Mitchell, Scottish architect (born 1856)
- December 1 – Peder Vilhelm Jensen-Klint, Danish architect, designer, painter and architectural theorist (born 1853)
- Robert Worley, English architect (born 1850)
