= St Dunstan-in-the-East =

Coordinates: 51°30′34.82″N 0°4′57.80″W

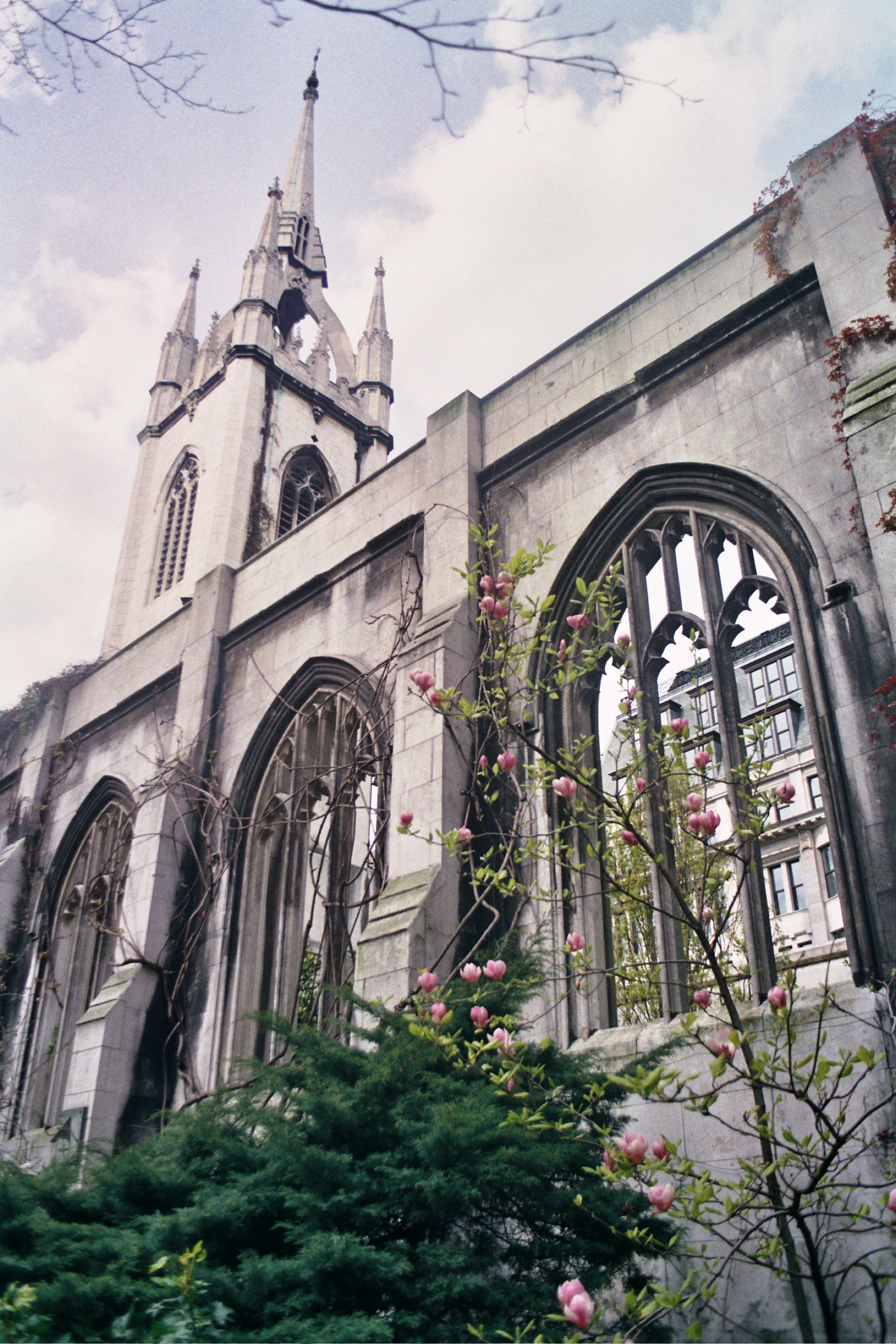
- The site in 2010
- St Dunstan-in-the-East
- Location: St. Dunstan's Hill; London, EC3
- Country: England
- Denomination: Roman Catholic, Church of England
- Website: Official City of London page

Architecture
- Heritage designation: Grade I
- Architect(s): Christopher Wren, David Laing

St Dunstan-in-the-East was a Church of England parish church on St Dunstan's Hill, halfway between London Bridge and the Tower of London in the City of London. The church was largely destroyed in the Second World War and the ruins are now a public garden maintained by the City of London Corporation.

== History ==
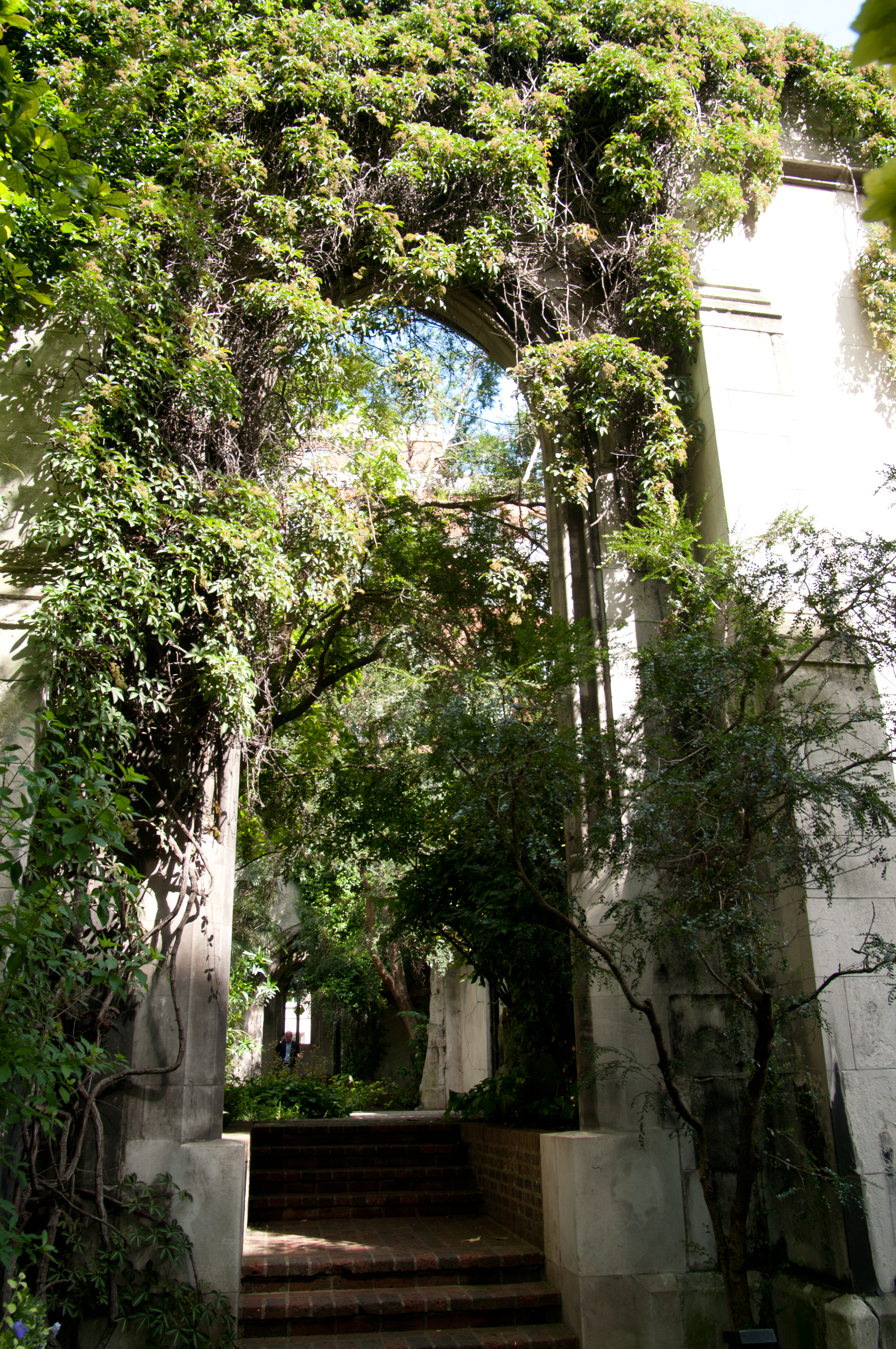
St Dunstan-in-the-East inside (2014)

The church was originally built in about 1100. A new south aisle was added in 1391 and the church was repaired in 1631 at a cost of more than £2,400.

It was severely damaged in the Great Fire of London in 1666. Rather than being completely rebuilt, the damaged church was patched up between 1668 and 1671. A steeple was added in 1695–1701 to the designs of Sir Christopher Wren. It was built in a gothic style sympathetic to the main body of the church, though with heavy string courses of a kind not used in the Middle Ages. It has a needle spire carried on four flying buttresses in the manner of that of St Nicholas in Newcastle. The restored church had wooden carvings by Grinling Gibbons and an organ by Father Smith, which was transferred to the abbey at St Albans in 1818.

In 1817 it was found that the weight of the nave roof had thrust the walls seven inches out of the perpendicular. It was decided to rebuild the church from the level of the arches, but the state of the structure proved so bad that the whole building was taken down. It was rebuilt to a design in the perpendicular style by David Laing (then architect to the Board of Customs) with assistance from William Tite. The foundation stone was laid in November 1817 and the church re-opened for worship in January 1821. Built of Portland stone, with a plaster lierne nave vault, it was 115 feet long and 65 feet wide and could accommodate between six and seven hundred people. The cost of the work was £36,000. Wren's tower was retained in the new building.

The church was severely damaged in the Blitz of 1941. Wren's tower and steeple survived the bombs' impact. Of the rest of the church only the north and south walls remained. In the re-organisation of the Anglican Church in London following the War it was decided not to rebuild St Dunstan's, and in 1967 the City of London Corporation decided to turn the ruins of the church into a public garden, which opened in 1971. A lawn and trees were planted in the ruins, with a low fountain in the middle of the nave. The tower now houses the All Hallows House Foundation.

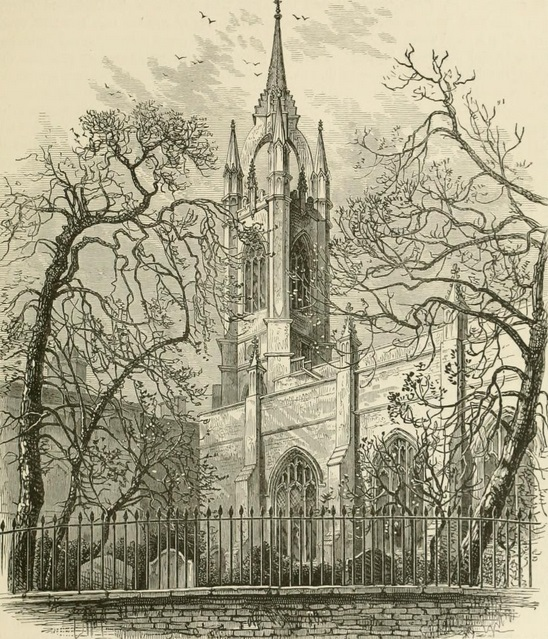
St Dunstan's in 1891

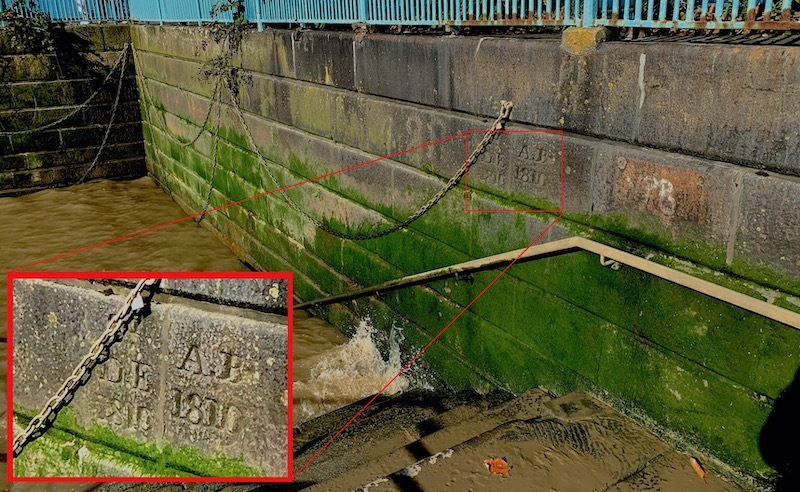
1a. All Hallows by the Tower & St Dunstan in the East parish boundary mark - see lostlcp.com for details

The parish is now combined with the Benefice of All Hallows by the Tower and occasional open-air services are held in the church, such as on Palm Sunday prior to a procession to All Hallows by the Tower along St Dunstan's Hill and Great Tower Street. The ruin was designated a Grade I listed building on 4 January 1950.

== See also ==
- St Dunstan-in-the-West
- List of Christopher Wren churches in London
- List of churches rebuilt after the Great Fire but since demolished
