= 1839 in architecture =

The year 1839 in architecture involved some significant architectural events and new buildings.

== Events ==
- May – Cambridge Camden Society is established in England by John Mason Neale, Alexander Hope and Benjamin Webb to promote Gothic architecture; also this year the Oxfordshire Architectural and Historical Society is founded as the Society for Promoting the Study of Gothic Architecture.

== Buildings and structures ==
=== Buildings completed ===
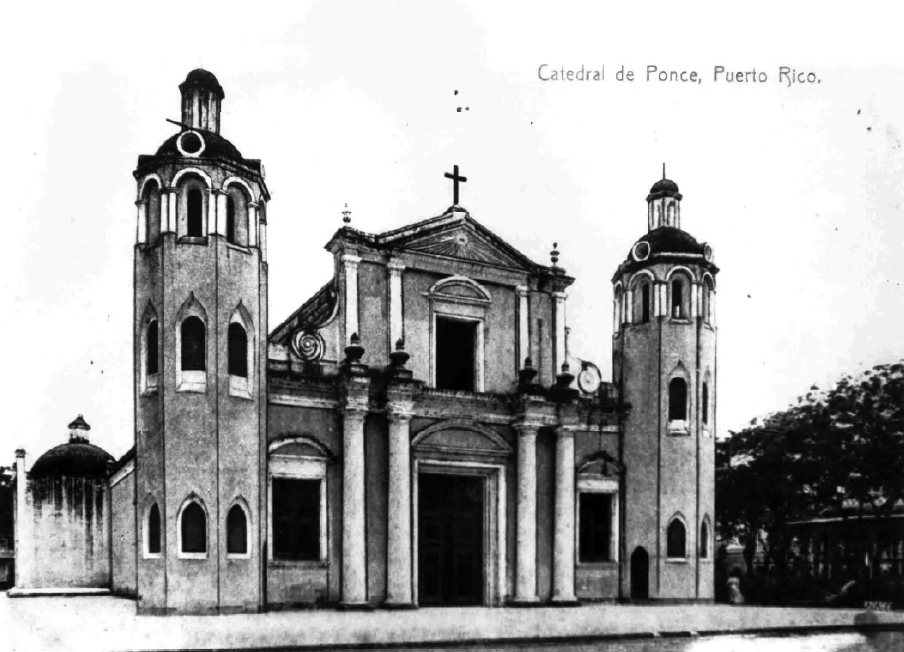
Ponce Cathedral with original façade

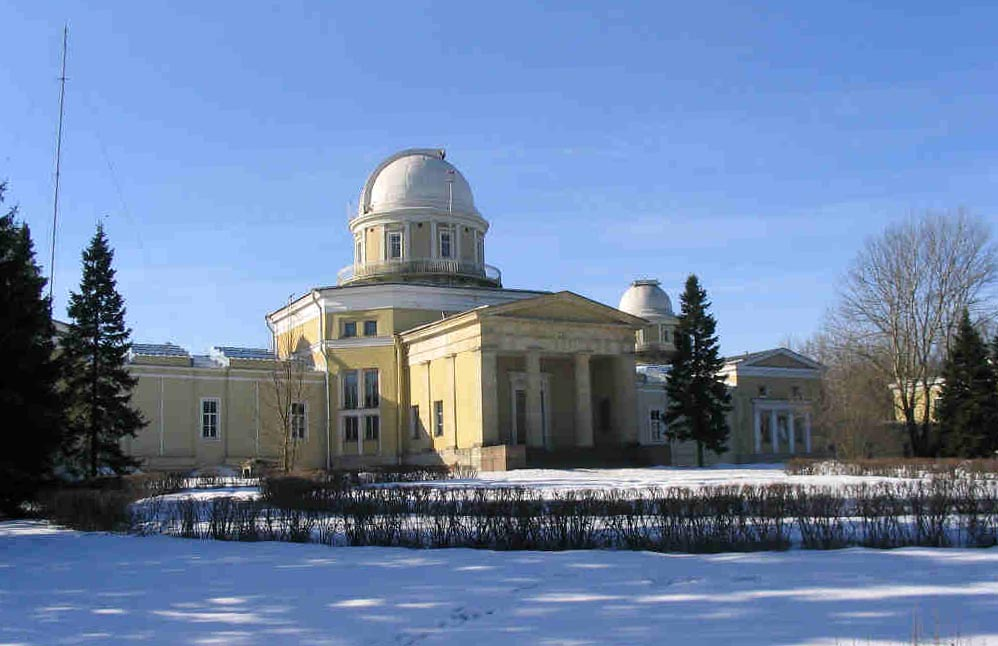
Pulkovo Observatory

- Ponce Cathedral, Puerto Rico
- St Mary's Church, Derby, England (Roman Catholic), designed by Augustus Pugin
- St Francis Xavier Church, Hereford, England (Roman Catholic), designed by Charles Day
- Upper Brook Street Chapel, Manchester, England (Unitarian), designed by Charles Barry
- Halifax County Courthouse (Virginia), designed by Dabney Cosby
- Old Customshouse (Erie, Pennsylvania), designed by William Kelly
- Lyceum (Alexandria, Virginia)
- Åbo Svenska Teater, Åbo (Turku), Finland
- Pulkovo Observatory, Russia
- Söderarm, lighthouse, Sweden
- Nine Elms railway station, London, designed by William Tite
- Avon, Maidenhead and Moulsford Railway Bridges on the Great Western Railway of England, designed by Isambard Kingdom Brunel
- Queen's Tower (Sheffield), England, a house designed by Woodhead & Hurst
- Wrest Park near Silsoe, Bedfordshire, England, a house designed by Thomas de Grey, 2nd Earl de Grey, for himself

== Awards ==
- Grand Prix de Rome, architecture: Hector Lefuel.

== Births ==
- May 17 – Alexander Davidson, Scottish architect active in Australia (died 1908)
- June 13
  - Robert William Edis, English architect and interior decorator (died 1927)
  - Ernest George, English architect and painter (died 1922)
- October 8 – George Gilbert Scott Jr., English architect (died 1897)
- October 29 – Imre Steindl, Hungarian architect (died 1902)
- November 12 – Frank Furness, American architect (died 1912)

== Deaths ==
- January 24 – Michele Cachia, Maltese architect and military engineer (born 1760)
- May 22 – William Atkinson, English Gothic Revival country house architect (born 1774/5)
- August 31 – William Wilkins, English architect, classical scholar and archaeologist (born 1778)
- November 15 – Giocondo Albertolli, Swiss-born architect, painter and sculptor active in Italy (born 1743)
