= 1848 in architecture =

The year 1848 in architecture involved some significant events.

== Events ==
- Joseph-Louis Lambot develops ferrocement, the forerunner of reinforced concrete.
- Louisa Caroline Huggins Tuthill publishes History of Architecture from the Earliest Times, the first history of architecture to be published in the United States.

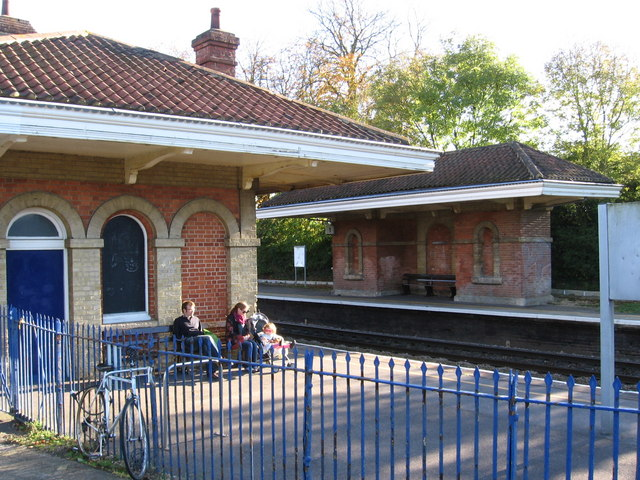
Mortimer railway station

== Buildings and structures ==
=== Buildings ===
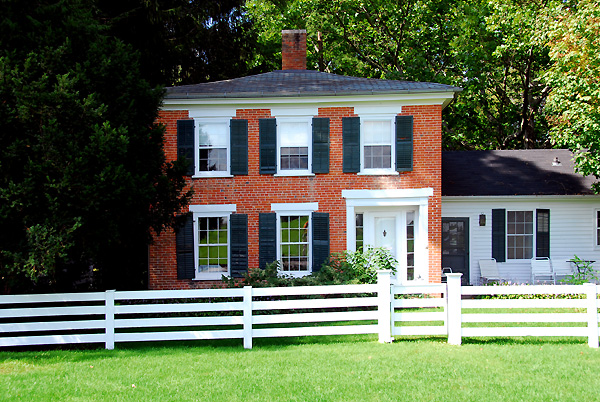
Duncan House, Cooksville, Wisconsin (1848)

- April 8 – Newmarket railway station in Suffolk, England is opened.
- May 1 – Stamford railway station in Lincolnshire, England, designed by Sancton Wood, is opened.
- June 19 – Monkwearmouth railway station in north-east England, designed by Thomas Moore, is opened.
- October – The Palm house at the Royal Botanic Gardens, Kew (London), designed by architect Decimus Burton and iron-founder Richard Turner, is completed and opened.
- October 9 – Stoke-on-Trent railway station in north Staffordshire, England, designed by H. A. Hunt, is opened.
- October 12 – Gobowen railway station in Shropshire, England, designed by Thomas Mainwaring Penson, is opened.
- October 25 – Cochituate Aqueduct, feeding Boston, Massachusetts, is completed; its gatehouses contain the earliest surviving wrought-iron roof structures and cast-iron staircases in the United States.
- November 1 – Mortimer railway station in Berkshire, England, designed by I. K. Brunel, is opened.
- November 20 – St. Michael's Cathedral (Sitka, Alaska) is completed.
- The Thorvaldsen Museum of sculpture in Copenhagen, designed by Michael Gottlieb Bindesbøll, is opened.
- The Sofiensaal in Vienna, converted into a ballroom by Eduard van der Nüll and August Sicard von Sicardsburg, is inaugurated.
- Construction of Cisternoni of Livorno in Italy, designed by Pasquale Poccianti, concludes with completion of Cisternino di città.

== Awards ==
- RIBA Royal Gold Medal – Charles Robert Cockerell.
- Grand Prix de Rome, architecture: Charles Garnier.

== Births ==
- William Frame, English architect working in Wales (died 1906)
- Luigi Manini, Italian architect and set designer working in Portugal (died 1936)
- William Henry Miller, American architect based in Ithaca, New York (died 1922)

== Deaths ==
- Thomas Duff, Irish ecclesiastical architect (born 1792)
