= Dance Base =

Scotland's national centre for dance

Coordinates: 55.9475°N 3.1974°W

Dance Base is the national centre for dance in Scotland.

As a company it has existed since 1984, promoting and delivering dance activity in Edinburgh. In June 2001, it moved into £6.4 million purpose-built premises on the Grassmarket in the city's Old Town. The premises were opened by Prince Charles, the Royal Patron of Dance Base, on 21 September 2001. The following month the Artistic Patron, choreographer Mark Morris, created and dedicated a new work at the Festival Theatre.

The centre now provides a programme of activities with their four studios and also out in the local community. There are three artistic programmes: a public programme providing over 100 classes in over 40 different forms of dance; a professional support programme, supporting and promoting professional dancers through classes, workshops and performance opportunities; a participation programme working with individuals and groups with a wide range of interests and abilities. Over 2,500 people a week attend Dance Base.

Dance Base has two in-house dance companies, LYDC (Lothian Youth Dance Company) made up of young dancers, and PRIME a dance company made up of older dancers. These companies perform regularly at Dance Base and across Scotland.

In partnership with Scottish Ballet, a Dance For Parkinson's programme was developed to help participants suffering Parkinson's disease to improve their balance and coordination as well as gaining in confidence and creativity.

As part of the centre's professional programme, they operate a performance platform at the Edinburgh Festival Fringe in partnership with Assembly Festival. It is designated as venue 22 of the Fringe.
