= 1849 in architecture =

The year 1849 in architecture involved some significant events.

== Buildings and structures ==
=== Buildings ===
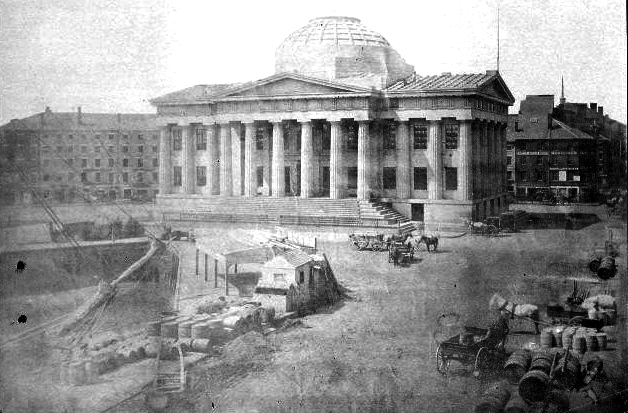
Boston Custom House

- March 1 – Ashby railway station, Leicestershire, England, probably designed by Robert Chaplin, opened.
- May 1 – Stone railway station, Staffordshire, England, designed by H. A. Hunt, opened.
- September 2 – Gare de l'Est railway station in Paris (France), designed by François Duquesnay, opened.
- October 30 – London Coal Exchange opened.
- December 1 – Gothenburg City Hall (Sweden), designed by Pehr Johan Ekman, opened.
- Church of the Immaculate Conception, Farm Street, central London, designed by Joseph John Scoles, completed.
- All Saints, Ennismore Gardens, south London, designed by Lewis Vulliamy, interior completed.
- Boston Custom House (Massachusetts), designed by Ammi B. Young, completed.
- Rich-Twinn Octagon House, Akron, New York, built.

== Events ==
- March – The Journal of Design and Manufactures is established by Henry Cole.
- May – The Seven Lamps of Architecture by John Ruskin is published.

== Awards ==
- RIBA Royal Gold Medal – Luigi Canina.
- Grand Prix de Rome, architecture – Denis Lebouteux.

== Births ==
- January 9 – Gaetano Koch, Italian architect (died 1910)
- February 22 – Carl Holzmann, Austrian architect (died 1914)
- May 22 – Aston Webb, English architect (died 1930)
- August 29 – John Sulman, English-born Australian architect (died 1934)
- c. December – Henry Tanner, English public building architect (died 1935)

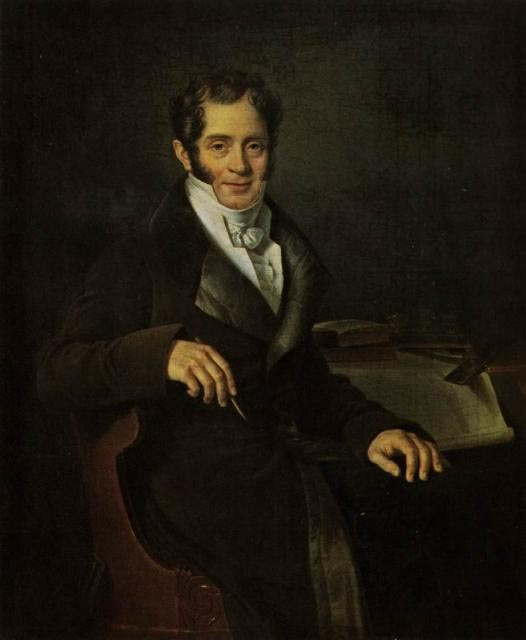
Carlo Rossi

== Deaths ==
- April 18 – Carlo Rossi, Neapolitan-born architect working in Saint Petersburg (born 1775)
- September – Daniel Robertson, American-born architect and garden designer working in Oxford and Ireland (born c. 1770)
- Robert Cary Long, Jr., American architect working in Baltimore (born 1810)
- John Pinch the younger, English architect working in Bath (born 1796)
