= Timothy Seow =

Singaporean architect (died 2019)

- Born: 1937/1938
- Died: 4 September 2019 (aged 81)
- Occupations: Architect, designer
- Years active: 1970s – 2019

Dr. Timothy Seow (1937/1938 – 4 September 2019) was a Singapore-based architect active for more than 40 years. Seow and his team at IDS (International Design Studio) constitute one of the most significant architecture firms in South East Asia, with a record of projects in Singapore, Canada, China and the Middle East. He was one of the pioneers who came up with the concept of high-rise buildings integrated with exterior gardens and swimming pools or what he calls “bungalows in the air”. This model has been emulated by most residential developments in Southeast Asia. The concept was widely influential and was one of the most significant early developments of what came to be known as green architecture.

== Early life ==
Timothy Seow was born and raised in Singapore. He was trained at Oxford Brookes University, London and during his travels was inspired by the architecture of San Francisco and Vancouver. When Seow later left his 30-year practice to join CPG Consultants, presently known as International Design Studio (IDS Studio) in 2003, he created quite a stir among his peers. Yet he claims this decision as the best move he has made in his career. IDS Studio is a large organisation with international exposure and offices in China, India, Vietnam, Philippines, Australia, and the Middle East.

== Career ==
Seow has been creating iconic development not only in Singapore but also abroad. Seow and his team have proposed refreshing design ideas and concepts for an abundance of high profile projects, winning numerous local and overseas awards in the process which made him prominent in this industry. He is involved in every project which is undertaken by IDS, helping to define and determine how the projects can accomplish more than was required in the design brief.

He has been featured in several magazines and newspapers including The Business Times, The Edge, Home & Décor, Home & Apartment Trends and the Sentosa Cove. He appeared in the World Architecture magazine for his designs in Philippines, Malaysia and Singapore.

== Notable buildings ==
- Tong Building, Singapore. Located in Singapore's famous Orchard Road, this 19-story building was built in 1978. It is designed for mixed retail, commercial and residential purposes. It was one of the unique buildings of the mid-80s because of its curtain wall look façade. It had a setback concept creating a plaza where a wide variety of activities could take place. Even after 37 yrs, the Tong Building still retains its contemporary look. Seow won an honorable mention award by the Singapore Institute of Architects in the category of Commercial Projects.
- Icon Residence, Malaysia Icon Residences features buildings blocks that gives each tower a uniquely different profile, with bridges linking internal spaces and gardens weaving in and around the units. It is located in Mont Kiara which is in the heart of Kuala Lumpur, Malaysia's federal capital. Icon Residence also won several awards.
- Icon City, Malaysia This award winning building is located in Petaling Jaya, Malaysia. The design was inspired by the random characteristics of mountainous rocks weathered by nature. It is a mixed development consisting of two residential towers, boutique offices, a shopping mall and a hotel.
- St. Martin Residence, Singapore This building, built in 2001, is located on St. Martin's Drive, Singapore. It is a 4-story condominium with 82 housing units. The front view combines of both modern and traditional Asian elements.The idea behind this design was to create a vision of a tropical retreat on an urban island. This residency was awarded by the Singapore Institute of Architects in 2001 for its ‘Excellency in Architecture.”
- Manama Lagoon, Bahrain This residential building in Manama, Bahrain is unique in terms of its collective design elements. The use of gardens terracing from level to level is its main design component. The architecture consists of a series of rectilinear forms. Each unit has its own intimate, unique space with views towards the landscaped courtyards and water features looking out towards the views of the Bahrain waters. This building won the World Architecture News (WAN) award.
- ADM Building, Nanyang Technological University, Singapore It is the main building for the School of Art, Design and Media (ADM) at NTU. Lee Cheng Wee, who was with Timothy Seow's Studio, submitted an individual proposal and won the design competition for the School of Art, Design and Media (ADM). ADM consists of 3 interconnected blocks covered with roofs weaving in and out of the ground. The idea was to blend architecture with the environment (i.e. usage by the community) rather than dominating it. Timothy Seow subsequently led the execution. Completed in 2006, ADM is a 4-story building with sloped 'grass roofs'. Besides the aesthetic features, the roofs keep the temperature cool during day time. This building was one of the 4 international entries that received the Honour Award in 2007 for Innovative Learning Environments.

== Major awards and achievements ==
- 1974

– Won an international acclaim for his revolutionary work in defining new architectural forms.
– Incorporated the concept of “Bungalows-In-The-Air” in Futura, a high-rise residential building in Singapore.

- 1981

– Commissioned as the Master Planner for the township of Lekas Jaya at Kota Kinabalu, the capital of Sabah, a state in Malaysia. The Master Plan was presented to Mahathir Mohamad who was the Prime Minister of Malaysia at that time (1981–2003).

- 1998

– Conferred a Doctorate by Oxford Brookes University.

- 2001

– Won 2 awards at the Academy Awards for Architects in Singapore.

- 2012–2013

– Won the World Architecture News (WAN) Award for Manama Lagoon, Bahrain
– Won Asia Pacific Best Commercial Renovation / Redevelopment 2012–2013 (Icon City Petaling Jaya).
– Highly Recommended: Office Development 2012–2013 (Icon City Petaling Jaya).
– Won Asia Pacific Best High-Rise Architecture 2012–2013 (Icon Residence Mont Kiara).
– Won Malaysia Best High-Rise Architecture 2012–2013 (Icon Residence Mont Kiara).
– Won the World Architecture News (WAN) Award.
