= Jan Hoogstad =

Dutch architect

Jan Hoogstad (born 29 June 1930, died 3 October 2018) was a Dutch architect. His best-known building is the VROM Building (Ministry of Housing) in The Hague.

== Biography ==
Other projects include the TNO-NiTG Building at the Utrecht Uithof complex and the Enschede Muziekkwartier. In addition to his architectural work, Jan Hoogstad gives frequent (guest) lectures at various national and international organizations. Jan Hoogstad ranks among the International Academy of Architecture's Academicians and is President of the International Centre in Rotterdam. He is also a founder and board member of the Megacities Foundation.

Hoogstad was born in Rotterdam. He has been awarded the Dutch Royal knight order Officer in the order of Orange Nassau and received the Laurenspenning of the city of Rotterdam.
