= 1922 in architecture =

The year 1922 in architecture involved some significant architectural events and new buildings.

== Events ==
- Construction of Böttcherstraße in Bremen, Germany, in the Brick Expressionist style, begins.
- The proposed construction of a Monument to the Third International, designed by Vladimir Tatlin, is cancelled.

== Buildings and structures ==
=== Buildings opened ===
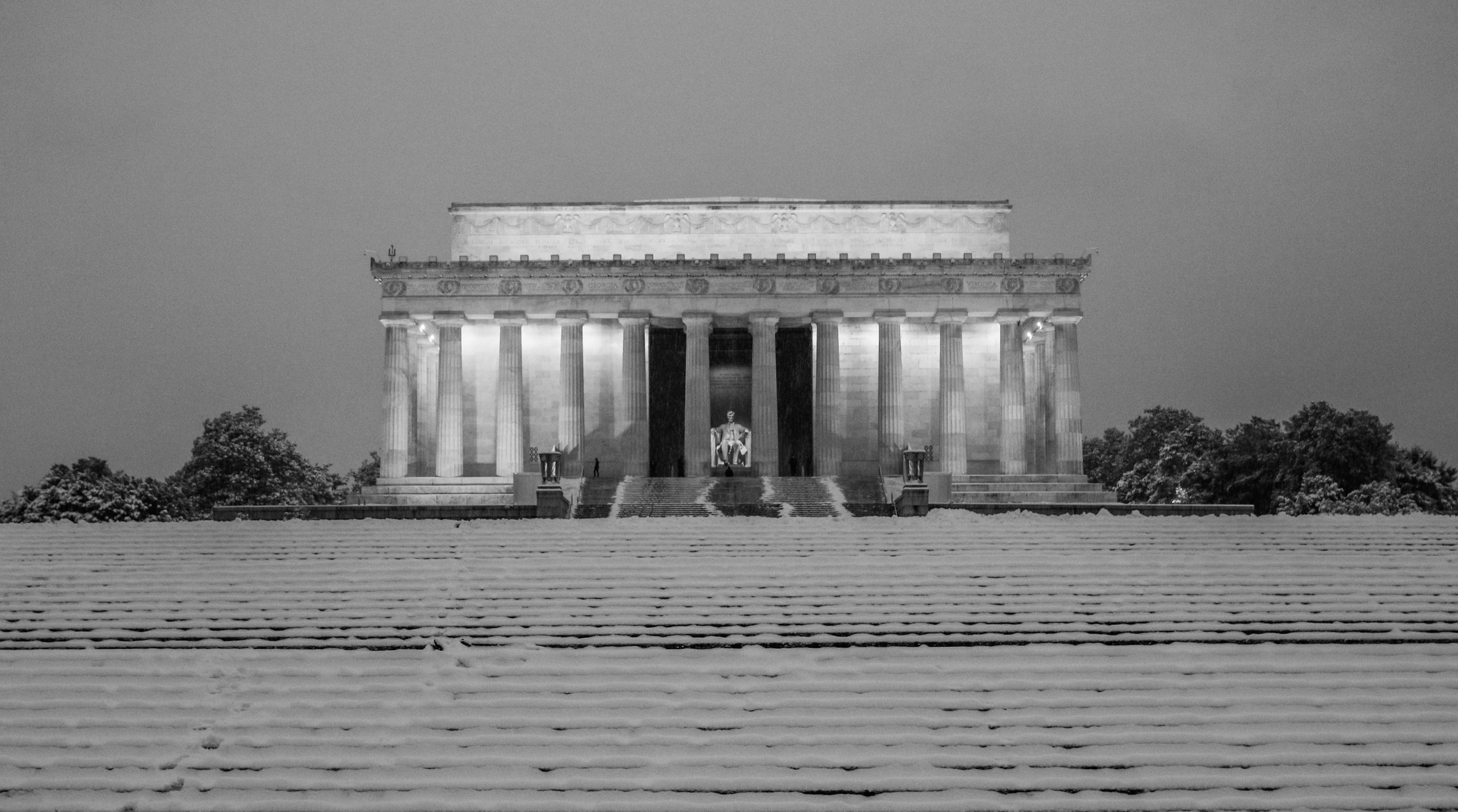
Lincoln Memorial in Washington, D.C., USA

- March 21 – Rebuilt London Waterloo station with war memorial entrance is officially opened (engineers: John Wykeham Jacomb-Hood and Alfred W. Szlumper; architect: James Robb Scott).
- May 30 – Lincoln Memorial in Washington, D.C., United States is dedicated by William H. Taft, in the presence of Abraham Lincoln's son, 79-year-old Robert Todd Lincoln.
- June 9 – Spalding War Memorial in England, designed by Sir Edwin Lutyens, is dedicated.
- October 14 – Gerrards Cross Memorial Building in England, designed by Sir Edwin Lutyens, is dedicated.
- November 26 – Rochdale Cenotaph in England, designed by Sir Edwin Lutyens, is dedicated.

=== Buildings completed ===
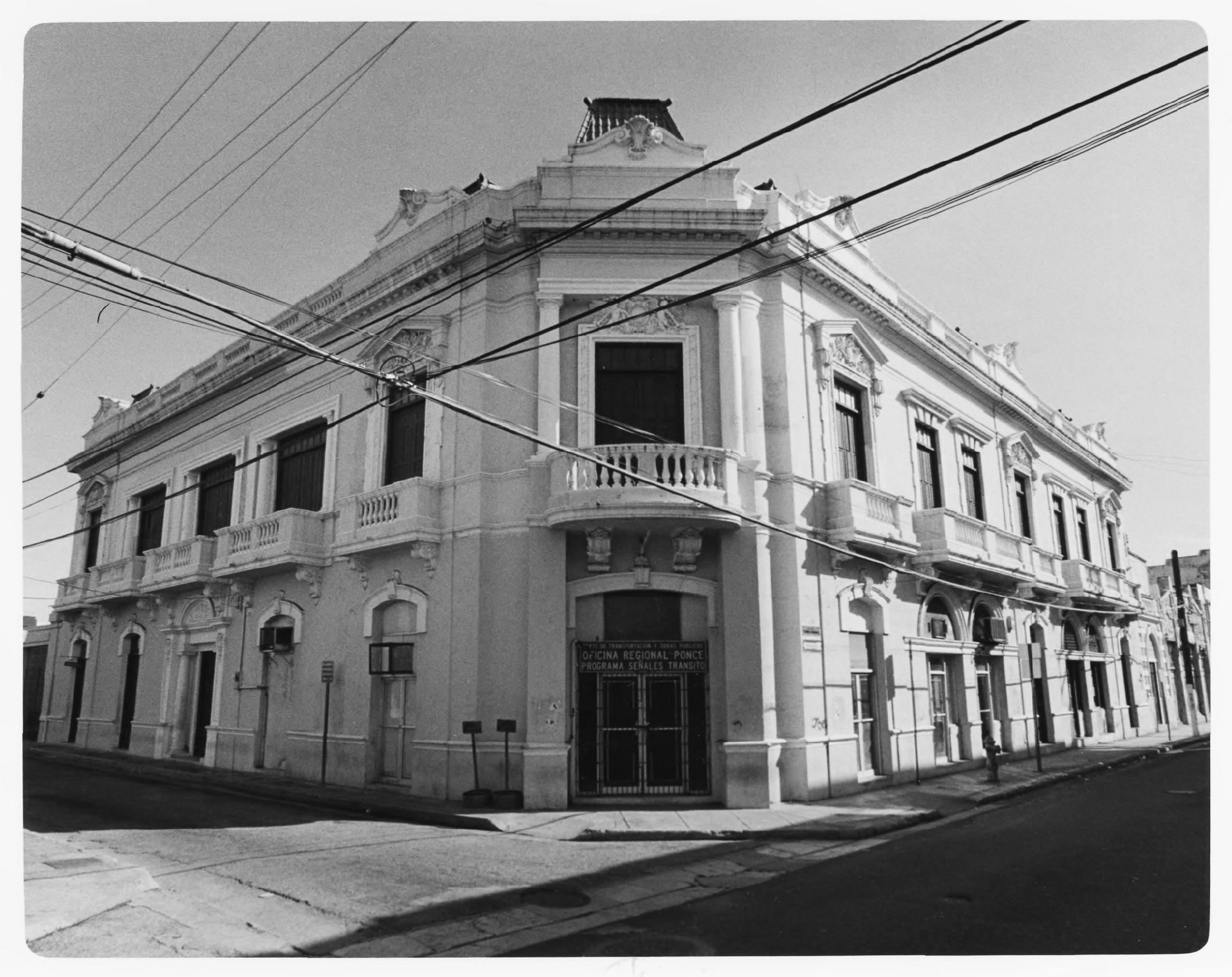
Antiguo Casino de Ponce in Puerto Rico

- Estonian Constituent Assembly (Riigikogu) building in Toompea Castle, designed by Eugen Habermann and Herbert Johanson.
- Church of the Sacred Heart and St Catherine of Alexandria (Roman Catholic) Droitwich Spa, England, by Frank B. Peacock.
- Antiguo Casino de Ponce, Puerto Rico, by Agustin Camilo Gonzalez.
- Phitsanulok Mansion in Bangkok, by Mario Tamagno.
- Shabolovka tower in Moscow, Russian Soviet Federative Socialist Republic, by Vladimir Shukhov.
- Wolseley Motors showrooms, 160 Piccadilly, London, by W. Curtis Green.
- Wrigley Building in Chicago, Illinois, by Graham, Anderson, Probst & White.
- Shukhov Tower in Moscow, by Vladimir Shukhov.

== Awards ==
- AIA Gold Medal – Victor Laloux
- RIBA Royal Gold Medal – Thomas Hastings
- Grand Prix de Rome, architecture: Robert Giroud.

== Births ==
- January 4 – Mart Port, Estonian architect (died 2012)
- March 14 – Colin St John Wilson, English architect (died 2007)
- April 13 – Valve Pormeister, Estonian architect (died 2002)
- May 29 – Iannis Xenakis, Greek composer, music theorist and architect-engineer (died 2001)
- June 14 – Kevin Roche, Irish-born American Pritzker Prize-winning architect (died 2019)
- Bill Howell, British architect (died 1974)

== Deaths ==
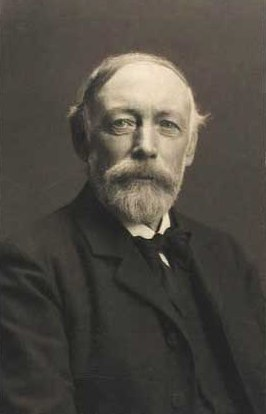
Hermann Baagøe Storck

- April 18 – Hjalmar Welhaven, Norwegian architect, palace manager and sportsman (born 1850)
- July 21 – Eugène Vallin, French architect, furniture designer and manufacturer (born 1856)
- September 19 – Benjamin D. Price, American architect known principally for his catalogue sales of plans for churches (born 1845)
- December 4 – Hermann Baagøe Storck, Danish architect and heraldist (born 1839)
- December 8 – Ernest George, English architect and painter (born 1839)
- William Henry Miller, American architect based in Ithaca, New York (born 1848)
