= Juliaan Lampens =

Belgian brutalist architect (1926–2019)

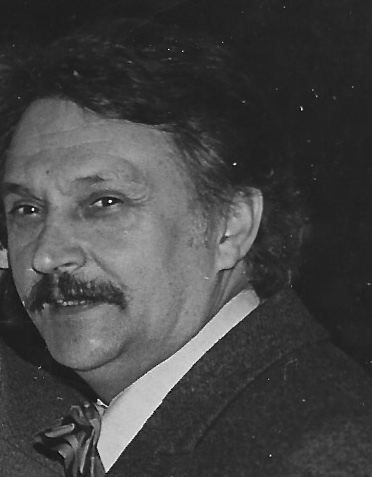
- Juliaan Lampens-1595858873
- Born: 1 January 1926; De Pinte, Belgium
- Died: 6 November 2019 (aged 93); Ghent, Belgium
- Occupation: Architect

Juliaan Lampens (1926 – 6 November 2019) was a Belgian brutalist architect.

== Biography ==
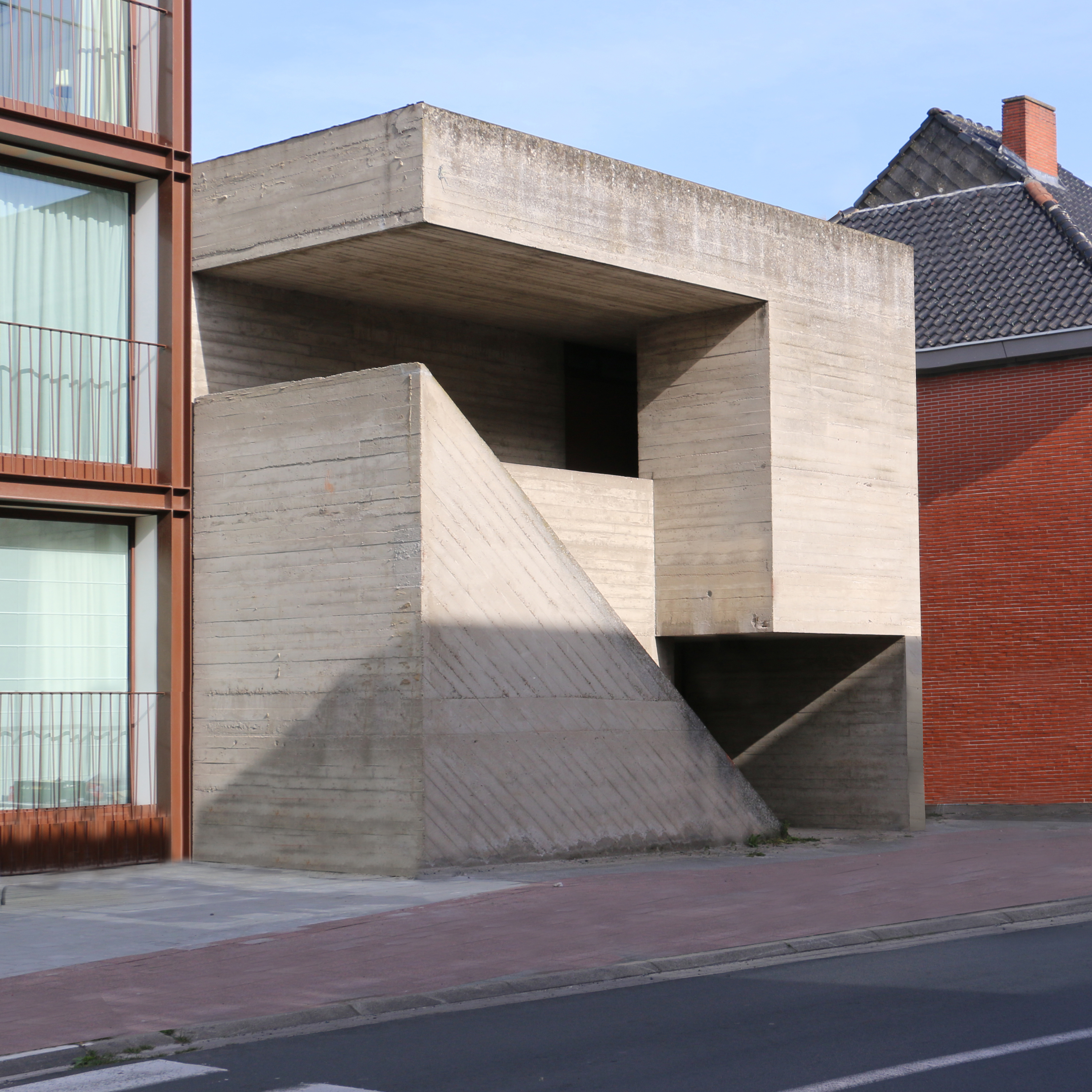
Library built in 1970 in Eke based on a design by Juliaan Lampens

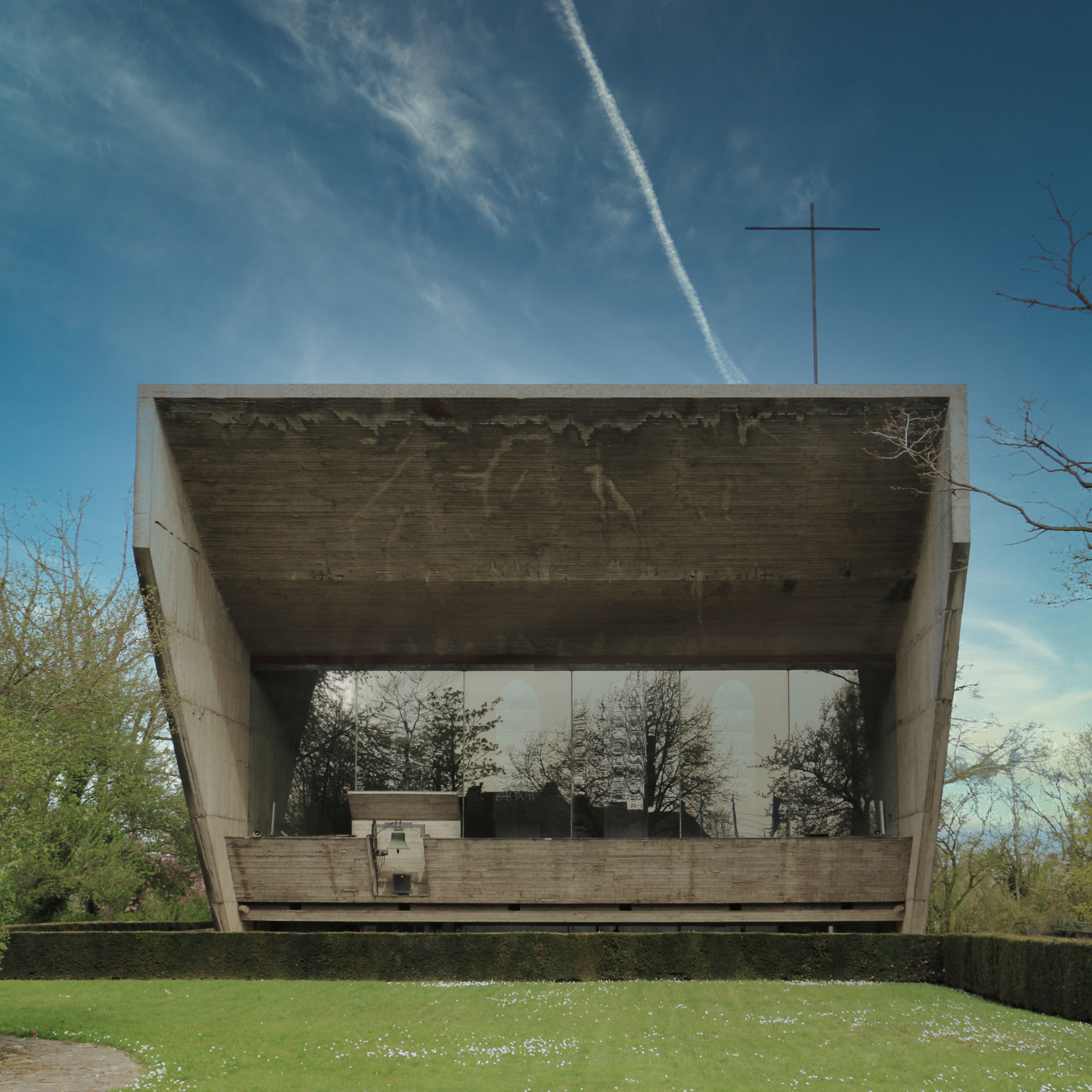
Pilgrimage chapel Kerselare near Oudenaarde, built in 1966 based on a design by Juliaan Lampens

After his studies in Ghent, Juliaan Lampens began his architectural career in Eke, East Flanders.

Although he started his career with more traditional architecture, Lampens' visit to Expo 58 in Brussels changed his architectural style to brutalism and concrete, much like the styles of Le Corbusier and Ludwig Mies van der Rohe.

The most significant designs of Lampens included his personal house (built in 1960), the chapel of Our Blessed Lady of Kerselare near Oudenaarde (built in 1966), The Vandenhaute-Kiebooms House in Zingem (built in 1967), The Van Wassenhove House in Laethem-Saint-Martin (built from 1970–1974), the Eke Public Library (built in 1970), the House Derwael–Thienpont in Gavere (built in 1973), the House Lampens-Dierick in Gavere (built in 1990), and the House Velghe in Deinze (built in 2002).

In 1974, Lampens began as a professor for the Institut Saint-Luc in Ghent, and earned the title of Full Professor in 1985.

Juliaan Lampens died on 6 November 2019 at the age of 93.
