= David Laing (architect) =

British architect

David Laing (1774–1856) was a British architect principally known as the architect of the Custom House in London, which was completed in 1817 and partially collapsed in 1825. Assisted by a young William Tite, he also rebuilt the church of St Dunstan-in-the-East between 1817 and 1821.

== Life ==
David Laing was born in London and baptised in the church of St Dunstan-in-the-East in March 1775. In 1790 he was articled to the architect John Soane. He set up his own architectural practice in 1796, initially designing private houses. in 1801 he published a book of his designs, entitled Hints for Dwellings, Consisting of Original Designs for Cottages, Farm Houses, Villas, etc., which sold well enough to be reprinted several times.

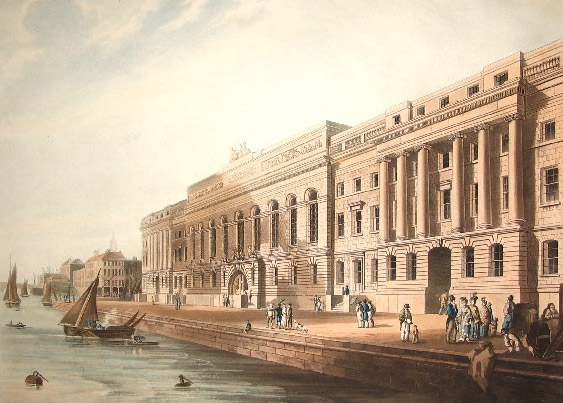
Drawing showing the Laing's Custom House

In 1810 he was appointed Surveyor to the Customs, and designed the new custom house at Plymouth. Two years later he was asked to produce plans for a new custom house in London, replacing the old building of 1718. His first suggestions were rejected, so he produced a simpler scheme, for a massive rectangular block. Laing estimated the cost at £209,000, but the contract was won by Miles and Peto, with a tender of only £165,000. During construction, costs escalated, and there were disputes between Laing and the contractors.

In 1818 Laing published a book of plans and drawings which included details of the problems he had encountered in laying the foundations of the Custom House. The foundations proved inadequate: in 1820, cracks appeared in the vault of the king's warehouse in the central section of the block, and four years later the facade of the long room above it collapsed, followed by the warehouse vaults themselves and the long room floor. Sir Robert Smirke, called in to investigate, reported that the work paid for had not been done to specification. The facade was rebuilt to Smirke's own design with new foundations.

After the collapse of the New Custom House Laing was suspended from his post as Architect & Surveyor of the Board of Customs, and his practice was ruined.

His other works included the rebuilding of St Dunstan-in-the-East, the Corn Market at Colchester and, after his dismissal from the post with the customs, Lexden Park and the Royal Universal Infirmary for Children.
