= 1763 in architecture =

The year 1763 in architecture involved some significant architectural events and new buildings.

== Events ==
- April 3 – Foundation stone of the church of La Madeleine, Paris laid; the original design, commissioned in 1757 from Pierre Contant d'Ivry, will not be completed.
- Chapel for Clare Hall in the University of Cambridge (England) designed by Sir James Burrough.

== Buildings and structures ==
=== Buildings opened ===
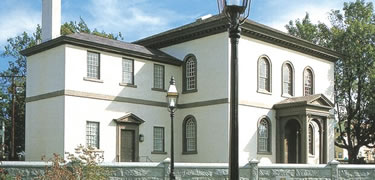
Touro Synagogue, oldest surviving synagogue in the United States

- May 14 – Nuovo Teatro Pubblico in Bologna, designed by Antonio Galli Bibiena, opened.
- July 24 – Požega Cathedral, Požega, Croatia, consecrated.
- December 2 – Touro Synagogue, Newport, Rhode Island, designed by Peter Harrison, dedicated.
- St Cecilia's Hall in Edinburgh, Scotland, designed by Robert Mylne, opened.

=== Buildings completed ===
- Börringe Castle, Sweden.
- Church of St. Mary Magdalene, Croome, Worcestershire, England, designed by "Capability Brown" (exterior) and Robert Adam (interior).
- Clérigos Church tower, Porto, Portugal.
- St. Mary's Roman Catholic Church (Philadelphia), Pennsylvania.
- Villa Albani in Rome, designed by Carlo Marchionni, is substantially completed.
- Donnington Grove in Berkshire, England, designed by John Chute, is built.
- Theater am Kärntnertor in Vienna, rebuilding by Nicolò Pacassi is completed.
- Present Use Storehouse (No. 11), Portsmouth Historic Dockyard, England, is built.

== Births ==
- August 8 – Charles Bulfinch, first native-born American to practice architecture as a profession (died 1844)

== Deaths ==
- February 2 – Emmanuel Héré de Corny, French court architect to Stanisław Leszczyński at Nancy (born 1705)
- September 12 – Johann Joseph Couven, German baroque architect (born 1701)
