= 1701 in architecture =

The year 1701 in architecture involved some significant events.

== Events ==
- Sir John Vanbrugh begins work on a house for himself, known as "Goose-pie House" (demolished 1898). At around the same time, he begins work on Castle Howard.

== Buildings and structures ==
=== Buildings completed ===
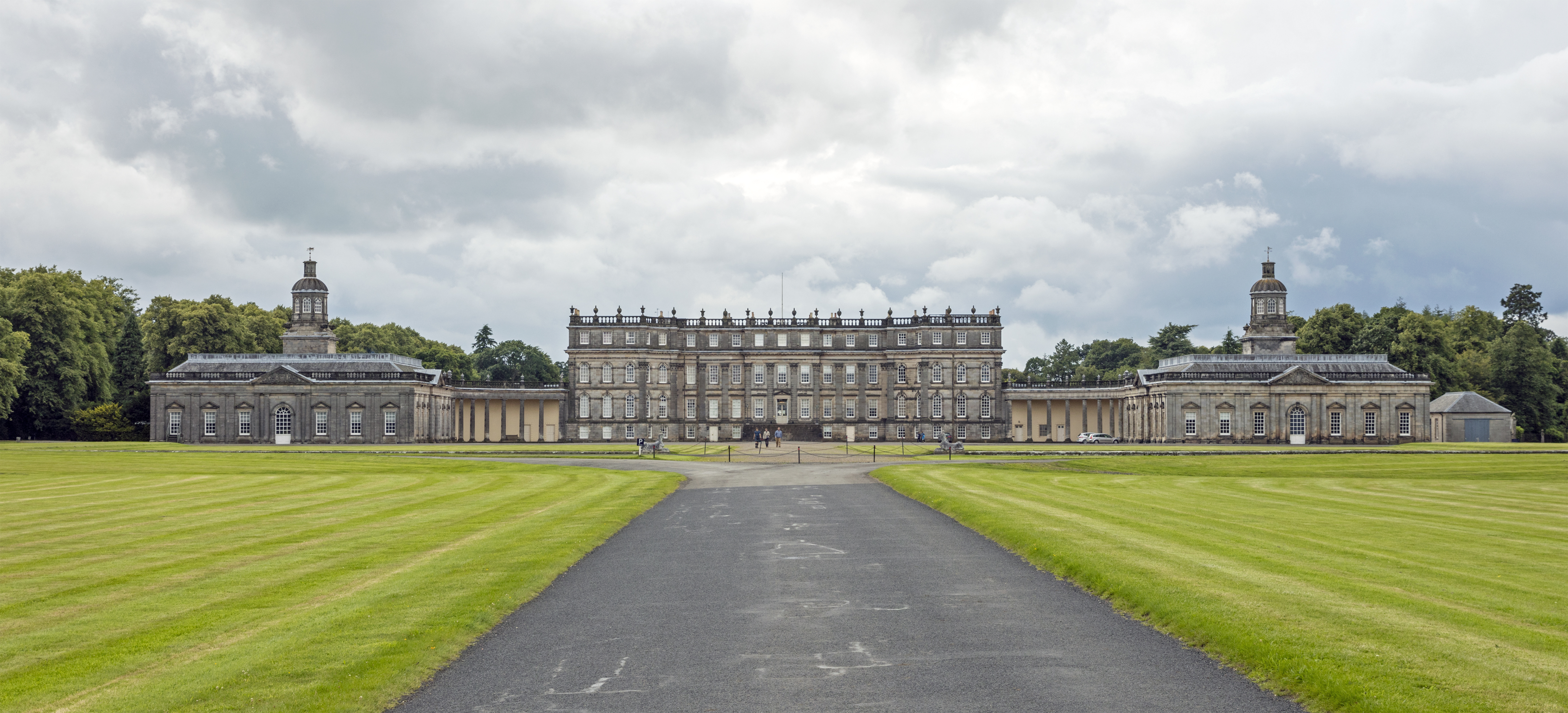
Hopetoun House, South Queensferry, Scotland

- Benjamin Cole House, Swansea, Massachusetts
- Bevis Marks Synagogue, London, England (first synagogue built in England)
- Dubdi Monastery, West Sikkim, India
- Església de Sant Esteve de Bixessarri, Andorra
- Hopetoun House, South Queensferry, Scotland, by William Bruce (begun 1699)
- Approximate date - Collegiate Church of Saint Magdalena and Saint Stanisław in Poznań, Poland (begun 1651)

== Births ==
- February – Johann Baptist Martinelli, Austrian architect and constructor of Italian descent (died 1754)
- April 9 – Giambattista Nolli, Italian architect and surveyor (died 1756)
- June – Nicolai Eigtved, leading proponent of the French rococo style in Danish architecture (died 1754)
- November 10 – Johann Joseph Couven, German Baroque architect (died 1763)
- Francesco Maria Preti, Italian Baroque architect (died 1774)

== Deaths ==
- Abraham Leuthner von Grundt, Bohemian master mason (born c.1639/40)
