= List of protected heritage sites in Eupen =

This table shows an overview of the protected heritage sites in the Walloon town Eupen, Belgium. This list is part of Belgium's national heritage.

Object	Year/architect	Town/section	Address	Coordinates	Number	Image
Church of St. Catherine ^{(nl)} ^{(de)}	15th century	Eupen Kettenis		50.646050°N 6.045334°E	31321 Info	Church of St. Catherine
Villa Schnellewind ^{(nl)} ^{(de)}	1737	Eupen Kettenis		50.636956°N 6.038226°E	31200 Info	Villa Schnellewind
Fussfall St. Rochus (Way of the Cross) ^{(nl)} ^{(de)}	1724	Eupen Kettenis		50.656077°N 6.041670°E	31322 Info	Fussfall St. Rochus (Way of the Cross)
Castle Libermé ^{(nl)} ^{(de)}	16th century	Eupen Kettenis		50.651723°N 6.048954°E	31320 Info	Castle Libermé
Favrunbachtal ^{(nl)} ^{(de)}	protected landscape	Eupen		50.646675°N 6.038176°E	31047 Info	Favrunbachtal
Tower of Gross Weims ^{(nl)} ^{(de)}	14th century	Eupen Kettenis		50.650386°N 6.042161°E	31317 Info	Tower of Gross Weims
Philippenhaus ^{(nl)} ^{(de)}	1767	Eupen Kettenis		50.661916°N 6.053592°E	31323 Info	Philippenhaus
Old house ^{(nl)} ^{(de)}	1790	Eupen Kettenis	Winkelstrasse 8	50.645781°N 6.045066°E	31318 Info	Old house
Old house ^{(nl)} ^{(de)}		Eupen Kettenis	Winkelstrasse 10	50.645745°N 6.044925°E	31319 Info	Old house
Belgian-Prussian border markers 158-186 ^{(nl)} ^{(de)}	19th century	Eupen		50.308639°N 6.013061°E	31215 Info	Belgian-Prussian border markers 158-186
Church of St. Nicolas ^{(nl)} ^{(de)}	1721−1726; Laurenz Mefferdatis	Eupen		50.630734°N 6.032577°E	31133 Info	Church of St. Nicolas
Rectory ^{(nl)} ^{(de)}	1707	Eupen		50.631042°N 6.032886°E	31132 Info	Rectory
Old churchyard with graves ^{(nl)} ^{(de)}	1861−1892	Eupen		50.630488°N 6.032399°E	31131 Info	Old churchyard with graves
Church of the Immaculate Conception ^{(nl)} ^{(de)}	1773—1776; Joseph Moretti	Eupen		50.632499°N 6.030014°E	31128 Info	Church of the Immaculate Conception
Town hall ^{(nl)} ^{(de)}	1773—1776; Joseph Moretti	Eupen		50.632499°N 6.030014°E	31138 Info	Town hall
Chapel of St. Lambert ^{(nl)} ^{(de)}	1690	Eupen		50.632511°N 6.039314°E	31139 Info	Chapel of St. Lambert
Chapel of the decapitation of St. John the Baptist ^{(nl)} ^{(de)}	1748; Johann Joseph Couven	Eupen		50.633087°N 6.048025°E	31127 Info	Chapel of the decapitation of St. John the Baptist
Old house ^{(nl)} ^{(de)}	18th century	Eupen	Bergstrasse 64	50.628078°N 6.033394°E	31151 Info	Old house
Peace church and 22 gravestones with old wall ^{(nl)} ^{(de)}	1851—1855	Eupen		50.630937°N 6.034669°E	31325 Info	Peace church and 22 gravestones with old wall
Organ of the peace church ^{(nl)} ^{(de)}	1907; Eberhard Friedrich Walcker	Eupen		50.630968°N 6.034474°E	31495 Info	Organ of the peace church
Ice cellar ^{(nl)} ^{(de)}	1869	Eupen	Borngasse	50.629902°N 6.034859°E	31208 Info	Ice cellar
Mountain chapel (Bergkapelle) ^{(nl)} ^{(de)}	1712	Eupen		50.624616°N 6.034112°E	31204 Info	Mountain chapel (Bergkapelle)
Modern gothic St. Joseph church with furnishings ^{(nl)} ^{(de)}	1855—1864; Vinzenz Statz	Eupen		50.622996°N 6.039588°E	31406 Info	Modern gothic St. Joseph church with furnishings
St. Michaels chapel ^{(nl)} ^{(de)}	1700	Eupen		50.631273°N 6.015191°E	31140 Info	St. Michaels chapel
Maria fountain ^{(nl)} ^{(de)}	1774	Eupen		50.630579°N 6.031514°E	31421 Info	Maria fountain
Old house ^{(nl)} ^{(de)}	1818	Eupen	Borngasse 1	50.630035°N 6.034098°E	31207 Info	Old house
Cross on the Heidberg mountain ^{(nl)} ^{(de)}	1819	Eupen		50.632940°N 6.039993°E	31422 Info	Cross on the Heidberg mountain
Old house ^{(nl)} ^{(de)}	18th century	Eupen	Edelstrasse 7	50.624251°N 6.037058°E	31141 Info	Old house
Parts of 17th-century monastery "Rekollektinnen" ^{(nl)} ^{(de)}	1700–1727	Eupen	Heidberg	50.633310°N 6.040470°E	31423 Info	Parts of 17th-century monastery "Rekollektinnen"
Old house ^{(nl)} ^{(de)}	18th century	Eupen	Gospertstrasse 17	50.631852°N 6.035070°E	31142 Info	Old house
Old house "Auf'm Rain" ^{(nl)} ^{(de)}	1720	Eupen	Auf'm Rain 2	50.630210°N 6.041292°E	31116 Info	Old house "Auf'm Rain"
Old house ^{(nl)} ^{(de)}	1701	Eupen	Gospertstrasse 22	50.632011°N 6.034546°E	31143 Info	Old house
Old house ^{(nl)} ^{(de)}	18th century	Eupen	Gospertstrasse 42	50.632120°N 6.035133°E	31144 Info	Old house
Old house ^{(nl)} ^{(de)}		Eupen	Haasstrasse 1-3	50.623847°N 6.036421°E	31146 Info	Old house
Garden of old house ^{(nl)} ^{(de)}		Eupen	Gospert 40-42	50.632609°N 6.034285°E	31326 Info	Garden of old house
Old house ^{(nl)} ^{(de)}	1724—1728; Laurenz Mefferdatis	Eupen	Kaperberg 2-4	50.631605°N 6.040162°E	31148 Info	Old house
Old house ^{(nl)} ^{(de)}	18th century	Eupen	Haasstrasse 24	50.623562°N 6.037998°E	31152 Info	Old house
Old house (museum) ^{(nl)} ^{(de)}	1697	Eupen	Gospert 52	50.632231°N 6.035426°E	31126 Info	Old house (museum)
Old house ^{(nl)} ^{(de)}	1730; Laurenz Mefferdatis	Eupen	Gospert 56	50.632286°N 6.035684°E	31221 Info	Old house
Old house ^{(nl)} ^{(de)}	18th century	Eupen	Gospert 68	50.632411°N 6.035950°E	31145 Info	Old house
Parliament building of the German-Speaking community of Belgium ^{(nl)} ^{(de)}	1812	Eupen	Kaperberg 8	50.631308°N 6.040584°E	31160 Info	Parliament building of the German-Speaking community of Belgium
Old house ^{(nl)} ^{(de)}	18th century	Eupen	Haasstrasse 26	50.623515°N 6.038133°E	31153 Info	Old house
Old house ^{(nl)} ^{(de)}	1645	Eupen	Haasstrasse 28	50.623437°N 6.038210°E	31154 Info	Old house
Old house ^{(nl)} ^{(de)}	1745	Eupen	Kaperberg 31-33	50.630696°N 6.041020°E	31339 Info	Old house
Old house ^{(nl)} ^{(de)}	1748	Eupen	Haasstrasse 40	50.623228°N 6.038606°E	31336 Info	Old house
Old house ^{(nl)} ^{(de)}	1710	Eupen	Kirchstrasse 1	50.630389°N 6.031927°E	31340 Info	Old house
Old house ^{(nl)} ^{(de)}	1747; Laurenz Mefferdatis	Eupen	Haasstrasse 42	50.623068°N 6.038797°E	31337 Info	Old house
Old house ^{(nl)} ^{(de)}	1830	Eupen	Kirchstrasse 16	50.630220°N 6.032907°E	31341 Info	Old house
Old house ^{(nl)} ^{(de)}	1723	Eupen	Heggenstrasse 8	50.633321°N 6.033664°E	31155 Info	Old house
Old house Kirchstrasse 17-23 ^{(nl)} ^{(de)}	1713	Eupen	Kirchstrasse 17	50.630134°N 6.032366°E	31342 Info	Old house Kirchstrasse 17-23
Old house ^{(nl)} ^{(de)}	18th century	Eupen	Heggenstrasse 10	50.633367°N 6.033736°E	31156 Info	Old house
Old house ^{(nl)} ^{(de)}	19th century	Eupen	Klosterstrasse 20	50.631515°N 6.031070°E	31161 Info	Old house
Old house ^{(nl)} ^{(de)}	18th century	Eupen	Heggenstrasse 14	50.633433°N 6.033869°E	31157 Info	Old house
Old house ^{(nl)} ^{(de)}	1757	Eupen	Klötzerbahn 27	50.631346°N 6.034603°E	31164 Info	Old house
Old house ^{(nl)} ^{(de)}	1800	Eupen	Paveestrasse 22	50.630735°N 6.030110°E	31193 Info	Old house
Old house ^{(nl)} ^{(de)}	1733	Eupen	Hochstrasse 185	50.645576°N 6.024725°E	31158 Info	Old house
Lane with trees ^{(nl)} ^{(de)}	protected landscape	Eupen	Hochstrasse	50.644965°N 6.024182°E	31429 Info	Lane with trees
Old house ^{(nl)} ^{(de)}	18th century	Eupen	Paveestrasse 29	50.630424°N 6.030304°E	31194 Info	Old house
Parliament building of the German-Speaking community of Belgium ^{(nl)} ^{(de)}	1760—1763; Johann Joseph Couven	Eupen	Klötzerbahn 32	50.631268°N 6.033969°E	31343 Info	Parliament building of the German-Speaking community of Belgium
Old house ^{(nl)} ^{(de)}	1748; Laurenz Mefferdatis	Eupen	Rotenberg 33	50.623857°N 6.030205°E	31149 Info	Old house
Steinrother Wäldchen ^{(nl)} ^{(de)}	protected landscape	Eupen		50.622185°N 6.006877°E	31045 Info	Steinrother Wäldchen
Cloister of the Franciscans ^{(nl)} ^{(de)}	1752; Johann Joseph Couven	Eupen	Marktplatz 1	50.630182°N 6.030975°E	31172 Info	Cloister of the Franciscans
Old house ^{(nl)} ^{(de)}	1744; Johann Joseph Couven	Eupen	Werthplatz 1-3	50.632483°N 6.038066°E	31357 Info	Old house
Old house ^{(nl)} ^{(de)}	1750	Eupen	Marktplatz 8	50.630696°N 6.031172°E	31173 Info	Old house
Old house ^{(nl)} ^{(de)}	17th century	Eupen	Werthplatz 2	50.632931°N 6.038465°E	31358 Info	Old house
Nispert house ^{(nl)} ^{(de)}	1747; Johann Joseph Couven	Eupen	Couvenplatz 1	50.633186°N 6.047884°E	31117 Info	Nispert house
Old houses ^{(nl)} ^{(de)}	1747	Eupen	Werthplatz 5-7-9	50.632354°N 6.038273°E	31195 Info	Old houses
Park of Nispert house ^{(nl)} ^{(de)}		Eupen	Couvenplatz 1	50.633559°N 6.048011°E	31344 Info	Park of Nispert house
Werthplatz house ^{(nl)} ^{(de)}		Eupen	Werthplatz 12	50.632927°N 6.038991°E	31359 Info	Werthplatz house
Werthplatz house ^{(nl)} ^{(de)}	18th century	Eupen	Werthplatz 48	50.631986°N 6.039646°E	31360 Info	Werthplatz house
Lange Kuhdrift ^{(nl)} ^{(de)}	protected landscape	Eupen		50.612394°N 6.053659°E	31046 Info	Lange Kuhdrift
Old house ^{(nl)} ^{(de)}	18th century	Eupen	Nispert 56	50.631814°N 6.050926°E	31175 Info	Old house
Castle Stockem ^{(nl)} ^{(de)}	1502	Eupen		50.630238°N 6.016284°E	31324 Info	Castle Stockem
Oe house ^{(nl)} ^{(de)}	1745; Johann Conrad Schlaun	Eupen	Oestrasse 48	50.616645°N 6.022335°E	31176 Info	Oe house
Old house ^{(nl)} ^{(de)}	18th century	Eupen	Olengraben 29	50.623992°N 6.033847°E	31178 Info	Old house
Old house ^{(nl)} ^{(de)}	19th century	Eupen	Paveestrasse 12	50.630982°N 6.029652°E	31191 Info	Old house
Old houses ^{(nl)} ^{(de)}	1815	Eupen	Paveestrasse 13-15	50.630607°N 6.029806°E	31180 Info	Old houses
Old house ^{(nl)} ^{(de)}		Eupen	Paveestrasse 14	50.630924°N 6.029719°E	31192 Info	Old house
Old house ^{(nl)} ^{(de)}	1850	Eupen	Paveestrasse 10	50.631090°N 6.029542°E	31190 Info	Old house
Timber-framed house ^{(nl)} ^{(de)}	1610	Eupen	Hufengasse 11	50.630115°N 6.030711°E	31338 Info	Timber-framed house
Old house ^{(nl)} ^{(de)}	1707	Eupen	Hookstrasse 40	50.633792°N 6.037930°E	31159 Info	Old house
Old house ^{(nl)} ^{(de)}	18th century	Eupen	Nispert 51	50.632008°N 6.050033°E	31174 Info	Old house
War memorial ^{(nl)} ^{(de)}	1912 Rudolf Henn	Eupen	Werthplatz	50.63224317°N 6.03913329°E	852 Info	War memorial
Garden shed of the house Place Werth 36-38 (the facade, the roof, the staircase, the cellar and the historical elements of the interior) ^{(nl)} ^{(de)}	18th century	Eupen	Werthplatz 36–38	50.63240139°N 6.04024104°E	31522 Info	Garden shed of the house Place Werth 36-38 (the facade, the roof, the staircase, the cellar and the historical elements of the interior)
Waldenburg House (house and outbuildings) ^{(nl)} ^{(de)}	17th century	Eupen Kettenis	Hochstraße 269	50.65915682°N 6.04958564°E	32239 Info	Waldenburg House (house and outbuildings)
House Bergstraße 62 (facade and roof) ^{(nl)} ^{(de)}	1720	Eupen	Bergstraße 62	50.62813346°N 6.03341912°E	31206 Info	House Bergstraße 62 (facade and roof)
Former cinema Capitol (front) ^{(nl)} ^{(de)}	1933 Bemelmans	Eupen	Neustraße 79	50.62610823°N 6.03114335°E	1006 Info	Former cinema Capitol (front)
Transformer house Merolser Straße ^{(de)}	1928	Eupen Kettenis	Merolser Straße	50.66115°N 6.06300°E	40770 Info	Transformer house Merolser Straße
Grange Looten	18th century	Eupen	Bergstraße 111	50.62654°N 6.03360°E	82110 Info	Grange Looten
Schulstraße 18	18th century	Eupen	Schulstraße 18	50.63100°N 6.03675°E	106854 Info	Schulstraße 18

== See also ==
- Lists of protected heritage sites in the German-speaking Community of Belgium
- List of protected heritage sites in Liège (province)
- Eupen
