= 1722 in architecture =

The year 1722 in architecture involved some significant events.

== Buildings and structures ==
=== Buildings ===
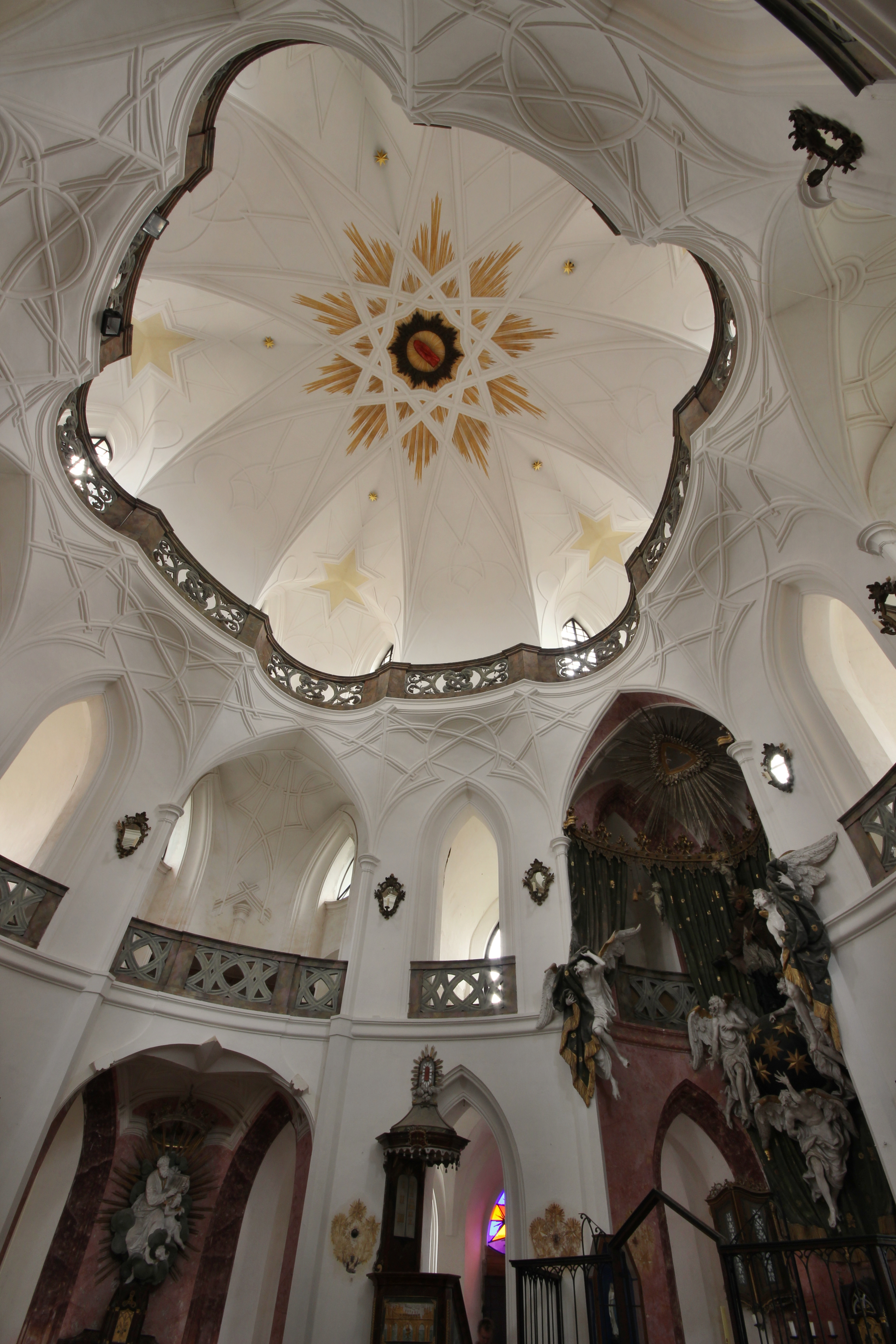
Church of Saint John of Nepomuk

- Blenheim Palace (begun 1705) in Woodstock, England, designed by John Vanbrugh, is completed.
- Wanstead House, near London, England, designed by Colen Campbell, is completed.
- Castletown House in County Kildare, Ireland, designed by Alessandro Galilei, is completed.
- Kantajew Temple in Bengal is completed.

== Awards ==
- Grand Prix de Rome: Jean-Michel Chevotet.

== Births ==
- March 17 – William Wentworth, 2nd Earl of Strafford, English peer and amateur architect (died 1791)
- August – James Essex, English builder and architect working in Cambridge (died 1784)
- Robert Smith, Scottish architect working in America (died 1777)

== Deaths ==
- June 20 – Christoph Dientzenhofer, Bavarian baroque architect working in Bohemia (born 1655)
- William Winde, English gentleman architect (born c.1640)
