= 1784 in architecture =

The year 1784 in architecture involved some significant architectural events and new buildings.

== Events ==
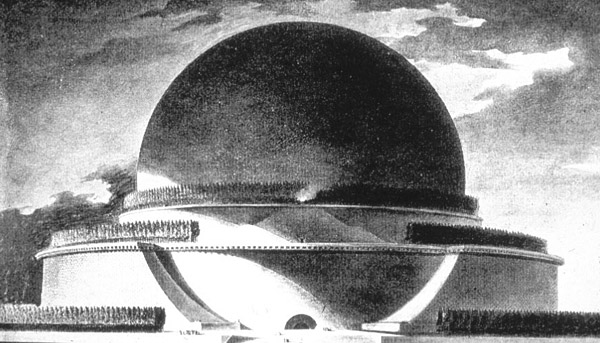
Étienne-Louis Boullée's unbuilt cenotaph to Isaac Newton

- September 1 – John Sanders becomes the first architectural student of John Soane.
- In Saint Petersburg, Russia, at the Gardens of Orienbaum, a ride is built that features carriages that undulate over hills within grooved tracks, a predecessor of the roller coaster.
- Étienne-Louis Boullée proposes a cenotaph to Isaac Newton.

== Buildings and structures ==
=== Buildings ===
- St Andrew's Church in New Town, Edinburgh, Scotland, designed by Andrew Frazer and Robert Kay, opened.
- In New London, Connecticut, the town hall is built (1784/85).
- Ishak Pasha Palace is built in Turkey.
- Ubosot at Wat Phra Kaew temple in Bangkok, Thailand, receives the Emerald Buddha (March 22).
- Work starts on La Moneda Palace in Santiago, originally intended to house the Spanish mint in Colonial Chile, designed by Joaquín Toesca.

== Awards ==
- Grand Prix de Rome, architecture: Auguste Cheval de Saint-Hubert.

== Births ==
- January 11 – Thomas Hamilton, Scottish architect (died 1858)
- January 21 – Georg Moller, German architect and town planner (died 1852)
- February 29 – Leo von Klenze, German Neoclassicist architect (died 1864)
- October 3 – Ithiel Town, American architect and civil engineer (died 1844)

== Deaths ==
- March – Thomas Cooley, English architect who worked in Dublin (born 1740)
- April 7 – Samuel Rhoads, American architect and cultural figure (born 1711)
- September 14 – James Essex, English builder and architect (born 1722)
