= 1754 in architecture =

The year 1754 in architecture involved some significant events.

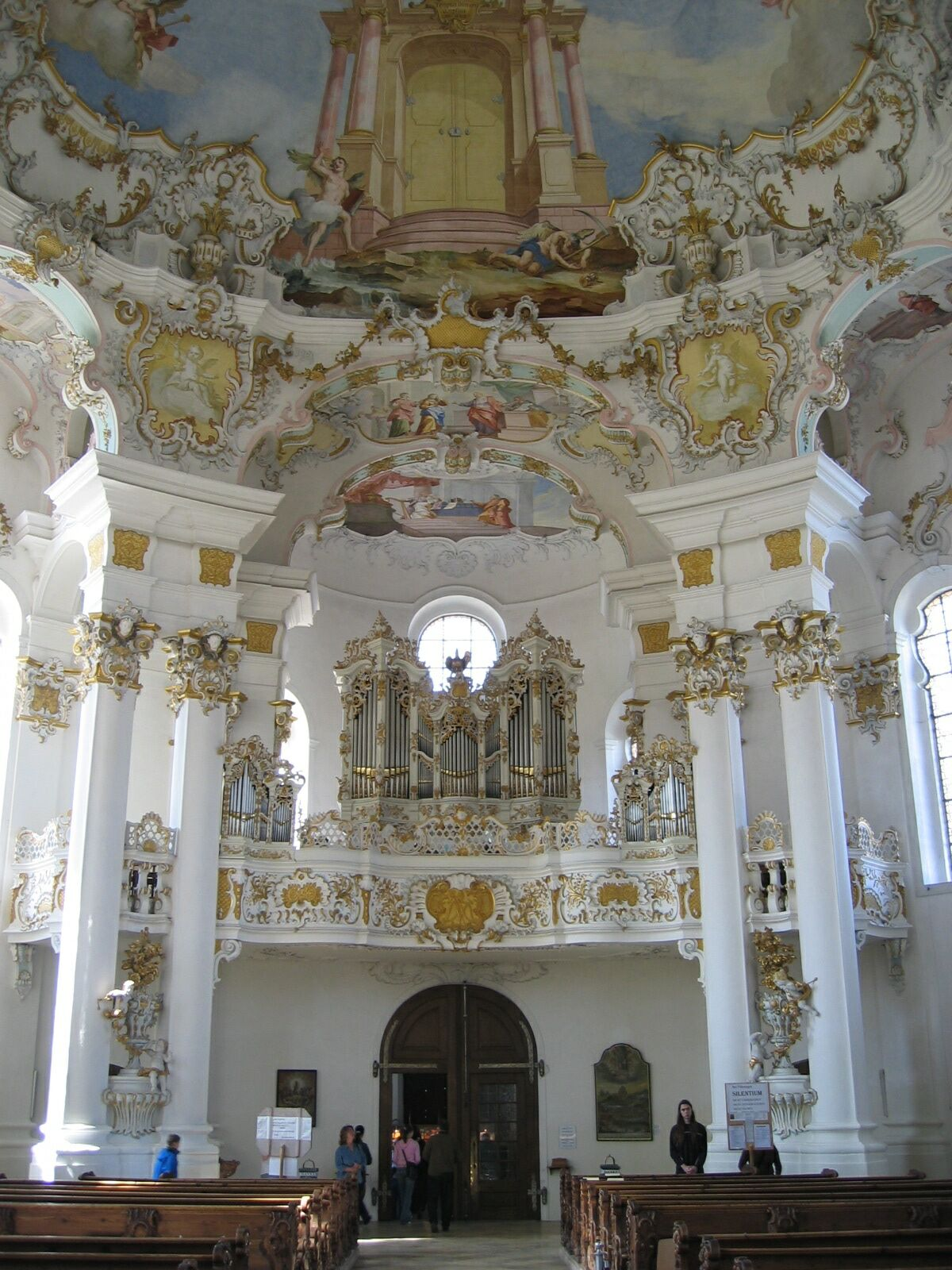
Wieskirche

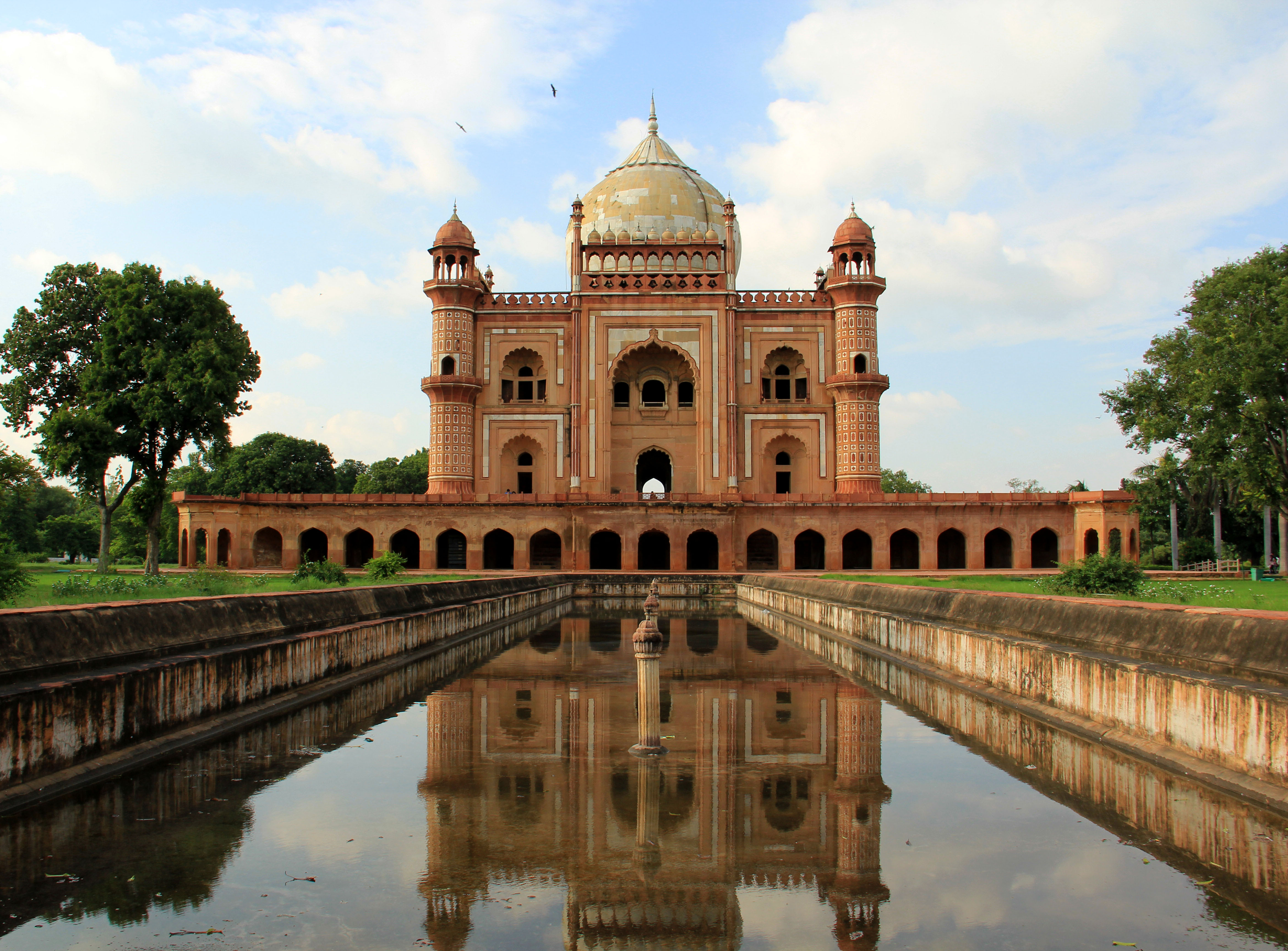
Tomb of Safdarjung

== Buildings and structures ==
=== Buildings ===
- The Holy Trinity Column in Olomouc, Moravia, finished and consecrated.
- King's Chapel, in Boston, Massachusetts, designed by Peter Harrison, completed.
- Wieskirche (Pilgrimage church of Wies) in Steingaden, Bavaria, designed by Johann Baptist Zimmermann and Dominikus Zimmermann, completed.
- Versailles Cathedral in France, designed by Jacques Hardouin-Mansart de Sagonne, completed and consecrated August 24.
- Basilica of Our Lady of the Pillar (Catedral-Basílica de Nuestra Señora del Pilar) in Zaragoza, Aragon, begun to the design of Francisco Herrera the Younger in 1681 and continued by Felipe Sánchez, completed by Ventura Rodríguez.
- Stroganov Palace in Saint Petersburg, designed by Francesco Bartolomeo Rastrelli, completed.
- Pavillon du Butard in France, designed by Ange-Jacques Gabriel for Louis XV, completed.
- Tomb of Safdarjung in Delhi, a late example of Mughal architecture, completed.
- Mow Cop Castle in Staffordshire, a folly, built by Randle Wilbraham.
- Liverpool Town Hall, in Liverpool, designed by John Wood, the Elder, completed.
- Stockholm Palace, designed by Nicodemus Tessin the Younger in 1698 and continued by Carl Hårleman, Carl Johan Cronstedt and Carl Gustaf Tessin, is first occupied by the Swedish royal family December 7.
- St Andrew's Church, Kiev, in Russia, designed by Bartolomeo Rastrelli, completed externally.
- Obando Church, in the Philippines, completed and consecrated April 29.
- Steeple added to Christ Church, Philadelphia, making it the tallest building in North America (at 60 metres).

== Births ==
- 2 February – Carl Ahasver von Sinner, Bernese architect (died 1821)
- 9 August – Pierre Charles L'Enfant, French-born American architect (died 1825)
- John Webb, English landscape designer (died 1828)

== Deaths ==
- 2 February – William Benson, English architect and politician (born 1682)
- 3 May – Joachim Daniel von Jauch, German baroque architect (born 1688)
- 16 May – Germain Boffrand, French architect (born 1667)
- 23 May – John Wood, the Elder, English architect working in Bath (born 1704)
- 7 June – Nicolai Eigtved, Danish architect (born 1701)
- 21 June – Johann Baptist Martinelli, Austrian architect (born 1701)
- 5 August – James Gibbs, Scottish architect working in England (born 1682)
- 12 November – Robert Morris, English architect and writer on architecture (born 1703)
- Charles Étienne Briseux, French architect, interior designer and writer (born c. 1680)

== Publications ==
- Giovanni Niccolò Servandoni – La Relation de la répresentation de la forêt enchantée sur le théâtre des Tuileries
