= 1766 in architecture =

The year 1766 in architecture involved some significant events.

== Buildings and structures ==
=== Buildings ===
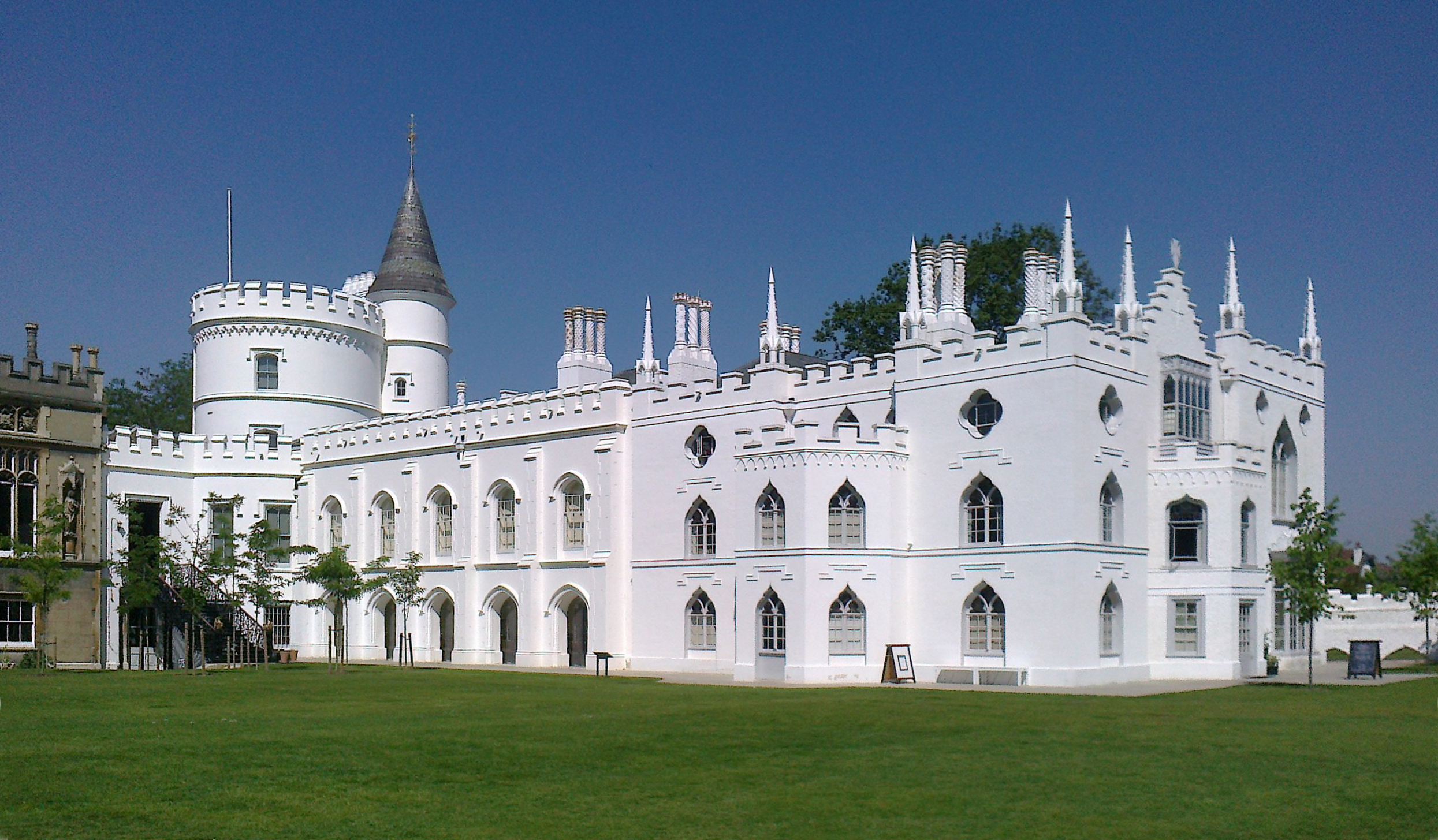
Strawberry Hill House

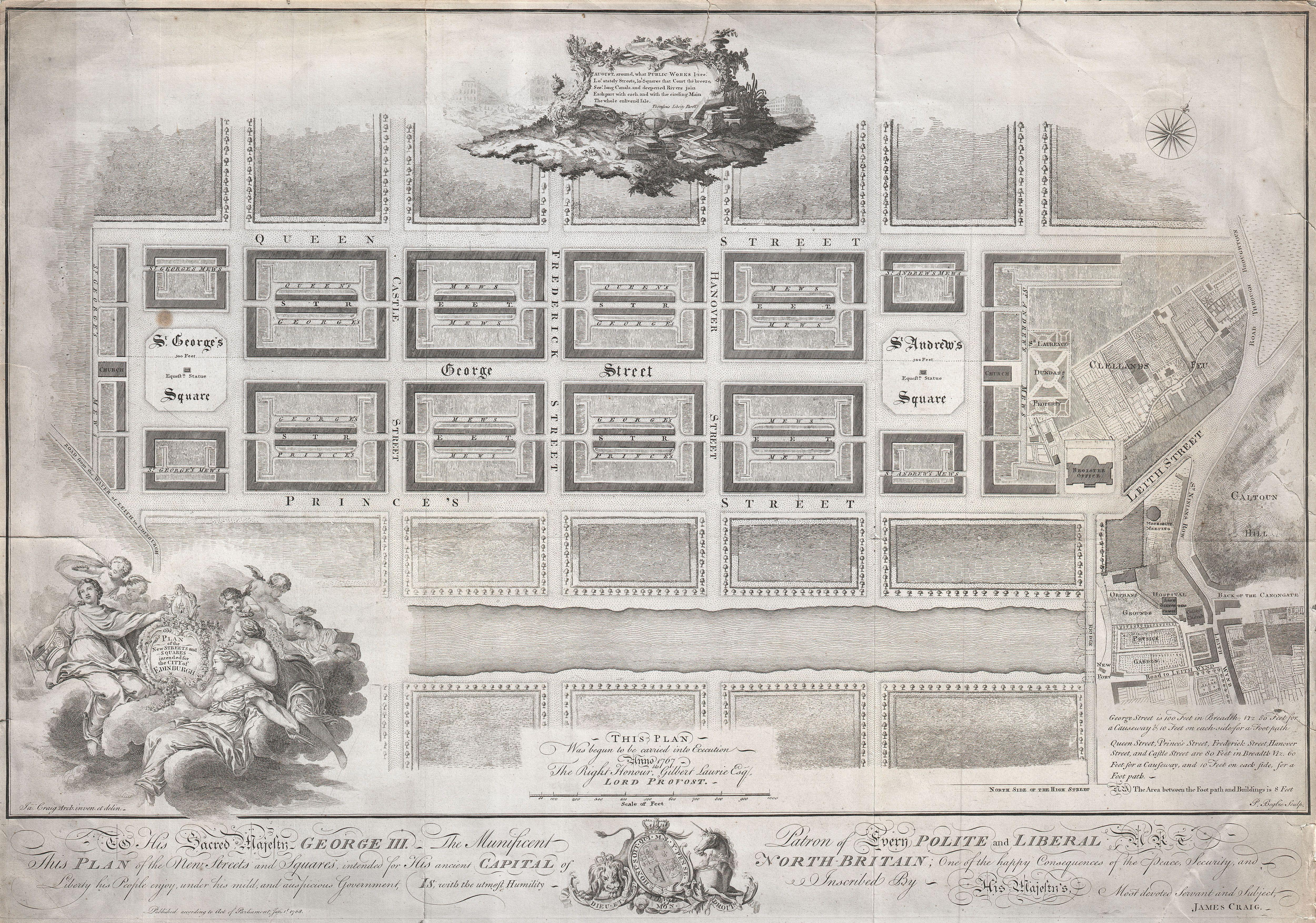
New Town, Edinburgh plan

- April 17 – James Craig's plan for the New Town, Edinburgh, Scotland, wins the prize offered by the city council in January.
- October 28 – Coldstream Bridge across the River Tweed on the England/Scotland border, designed by John Smeaton, is opened to traffic.
- Paxton House, Berwickshire, Scotland, is completed.
- Strawberry Hill House, London, designed by Horace Walpole, is completed in the Gothick style.
- Pazo de Raxoi in Santiago de Compostela, Spain, is completed.
- Rebuilding of Potocki Palace, Warsaw, to designs by Jakub Fontana, is completed.
- Shardeloes (country house) in Buckinghamshire, England, designed by Stiff Leadbetter, is completed.
- New main residence at Skjoldenæsholm Castle in Denmark, possibly designed by Philip de Lange, is built.
- Theatre Royal, Bristol, England, built by Thomas Paty to designs by James Saunders, is opened.
- New Drottningholm Palace Theatre in Stockholm, designed by Carl Fredrik Adelcrantz, is completed as an opera house.
- St. Paul's Chapel on Broadway (Manhattan) in New York City, designed by Thomas McBean, is completed.
- St Nikolaus church at Brohl in the Rhineland, designed by J. A. Neurohr, is built.
- St Markus church at Pünderich in the Rhineland, designed by Paul Stähling, is built.
- Stone Hermitage and Rozhdestvensky Bridges in Saint Petersburg are completed.

== Publications ==
- John Gwynn – London and Westminster Improved

== Births ==
- August 3 – Jeffry Wyatville, English architect (died 1840)

== Deaths ==
- January 19 – Giovanni Niccolò Servandoni, French architect and painter (born 1695)
- May 6 – Johann Michael Fischer, German architect (born 1692)
- July 14 – František Maxmilián Kaňka, Czech architect (born 1674)
- August 18 – Stiff Leadbetter, English architect (born c.1705)
- November 16 – Dominikus Zimmermann, German rococo architect (born 1685)
- December 20 – Giorgio Massari, Venetian baroque architect (born 1687)
- Isaac Ware, English architect (born 1704)
