= 1772 in architecture =

The year 1772 in architecture involved some significant architectural events and new buildings.

== Events ==
- January 27 – The Pantheon, London, designed by James Wyatt, opens to the public (demolished 1937).

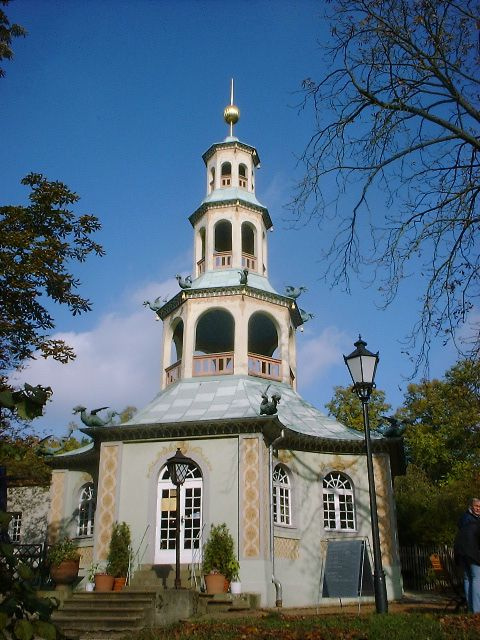
Dragon House, Potsdam

== Buildings and structures ==
=== Buildings completed ===
- Adelphi Buildings, London, designed by Robert Adam and his brothers.
- Basilica of the Fourteen Holy Helpers (Basilika Vierzehnheiligen) in Bavaria.
- Cathedral of Hajdúdorog, Hungary.
- Tomb of Mian Ghulam Kalhoro in Hyderabad, Sindh, consecrated.
- Dragon House (Sanssouci) in Potsdam, by command of King Frederick the Great.
- Old Stone Fort (Schoharie, New York), built as a Reformed Dutch church.
- Brick Market, Newport, Rhode Island, designed by Peter Harrison (begun 1762).

== Births ==
- February 16 – Friedrich Gilly, German architect, son of David Gilly (died 1800)
- June 8 – Robert Stevenson, Scottish lighthouse engineer (died 1850)
- John Foulston, English architect working in Plymouth (died 1841)
- Edward Gyfford, English architect (died after 1851)

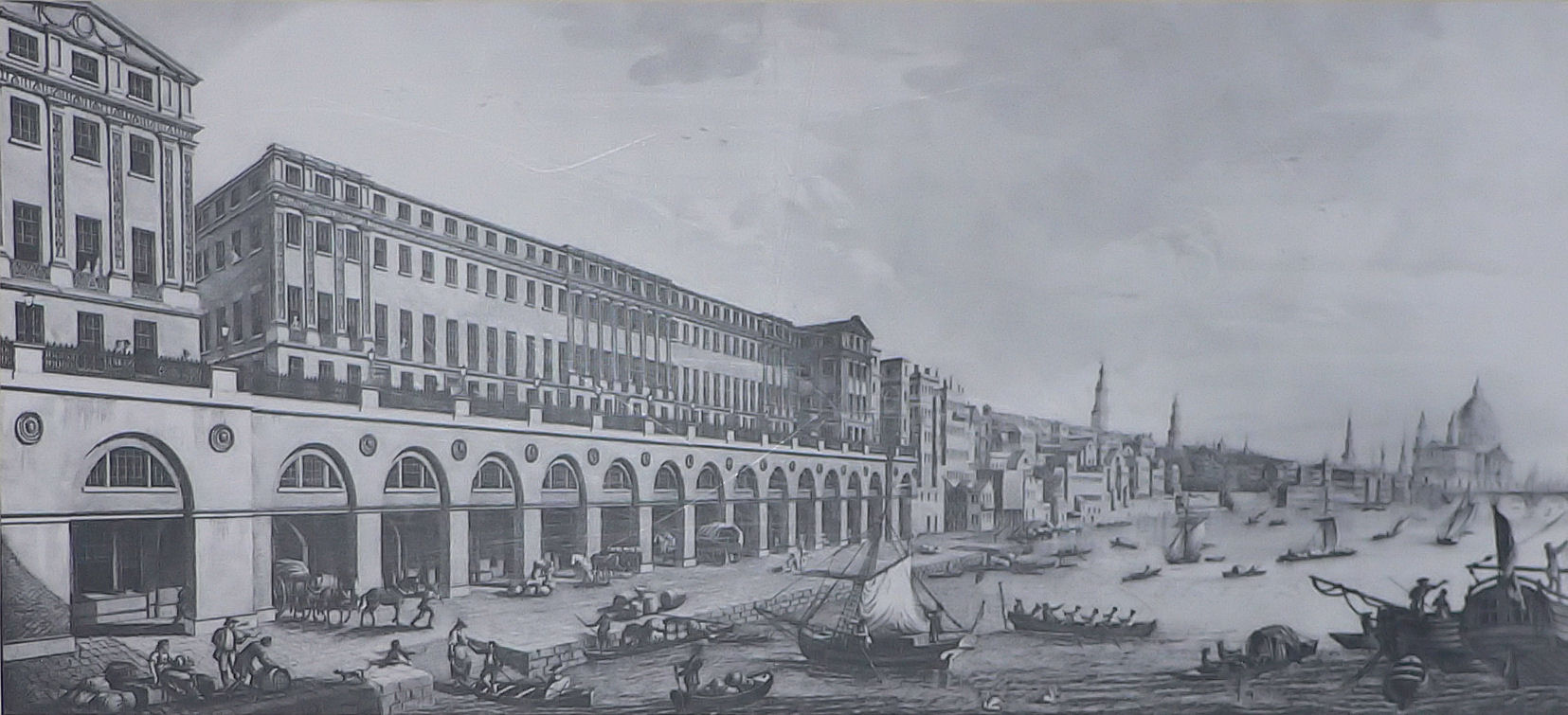
Adelphi Buildings, London

== Deaths ==
- March 10 – Martin Schmid, Swiss Jesuit missionary, architect and musician (born 1694)
- March 21 – Alexander Kokorinov, Russian architect and teacher (born 1726)
- October 19 – Andrea Belli, Maltese architect and businessman (born 1703)
