= 1850 in architecture =

The year 1850 in architecture involved some significant architectural events and new buildings.

== Events ==
- November 1 – Foundation stone laid for church of All Saints, Margaret Street, London, designed by William Butterfield. supervised by Beresford Hope for the Cambridge Camden Society as a model of the High Victorian Gothic ecclesiological style.

== Buildings and structures ==
=== Buildings completed ===
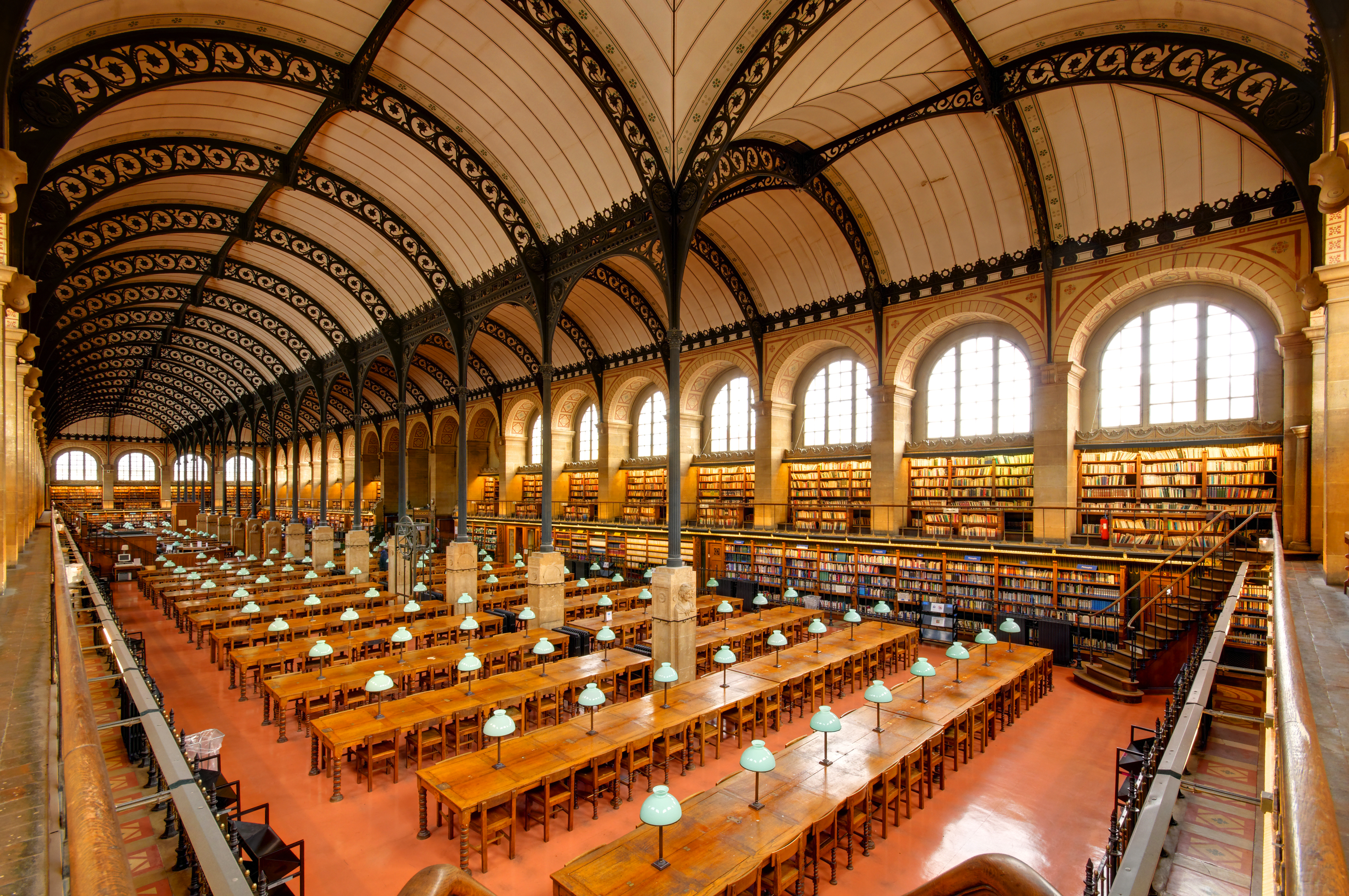
Sainte-Geneviève Library reading room

- Bratsberg Church, Trondheim, Norway.
- Hillsgrove Covered Bridge, Pennsylvania, USA.
- Britannia Bridge in North Wales, engineered by Robert Stephenson, is opened.
- Newcastle railway station in the north-east of England, designed by John Dobson, is opened.
- Sainte-Geneviève Library in Paris, designed by Henri Labrouste, is completed, the first major public building with an exposed cast-iron frame.
- Château de Boursault, France, designed by Jean-Jacques Arveuf-Fransquin.
- Peckforton Castle, England, designed by Anthony Salvin.
- Vĩnh Tràng Temple, Mỹ Tho, Vietnam.

== Awards ==
- Grand Prix de Rome, architecture – Victor Louvet
- RIBA Royal Gold Medal – Charles Barry

== Births ==
- January 10 – John Wellborn Root, Chicago-based US architect (died 1891)
- February 17 – Frank Darling, Canadian architect associated with Toronto (died 1923)
- November 15 – Victor Laloux, French Beaux-Arts architect and teacher (died 1937)
- December 21 – Lluís Domènech i Montaner, Spanish-Catalan architect, a leader of Modernisme català, the Catalan Art Nouveau/Jugendstil movement (died 1927)
- Robert Worley, English architect (died 1930)

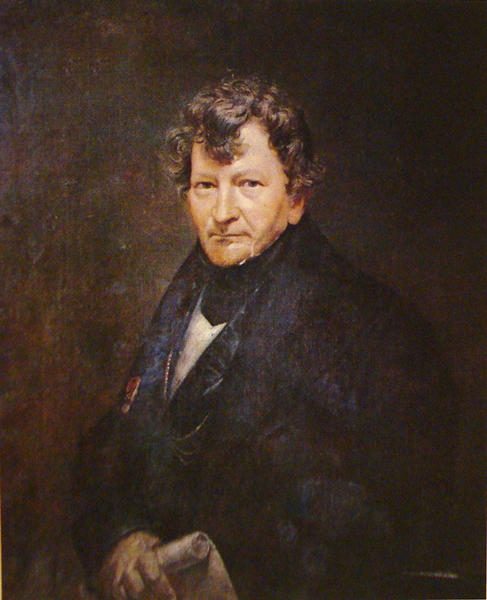
Auguste-Henri-Victor Grandjean de Montigny

== Deaths ==
- February 19 – François Debret, French architect (born 1777)
- March 2 – Auguste-Henri-Victor Grandjean de Montigny, French architect influential in Brazil (born 1776)
- May 8 – Antonio Niccolini, Italian architect, scenic designer, and engraver (born 1772)
- July 12 – Robert Stevenson, Scottish lighthouse engineer (born 1772)
- September 5 — John Holden Greene, American architect based in Providence, Rhode Island (born 1777)
