= 1704 in architecture =

The year 1704 in architecture involved some significant events.

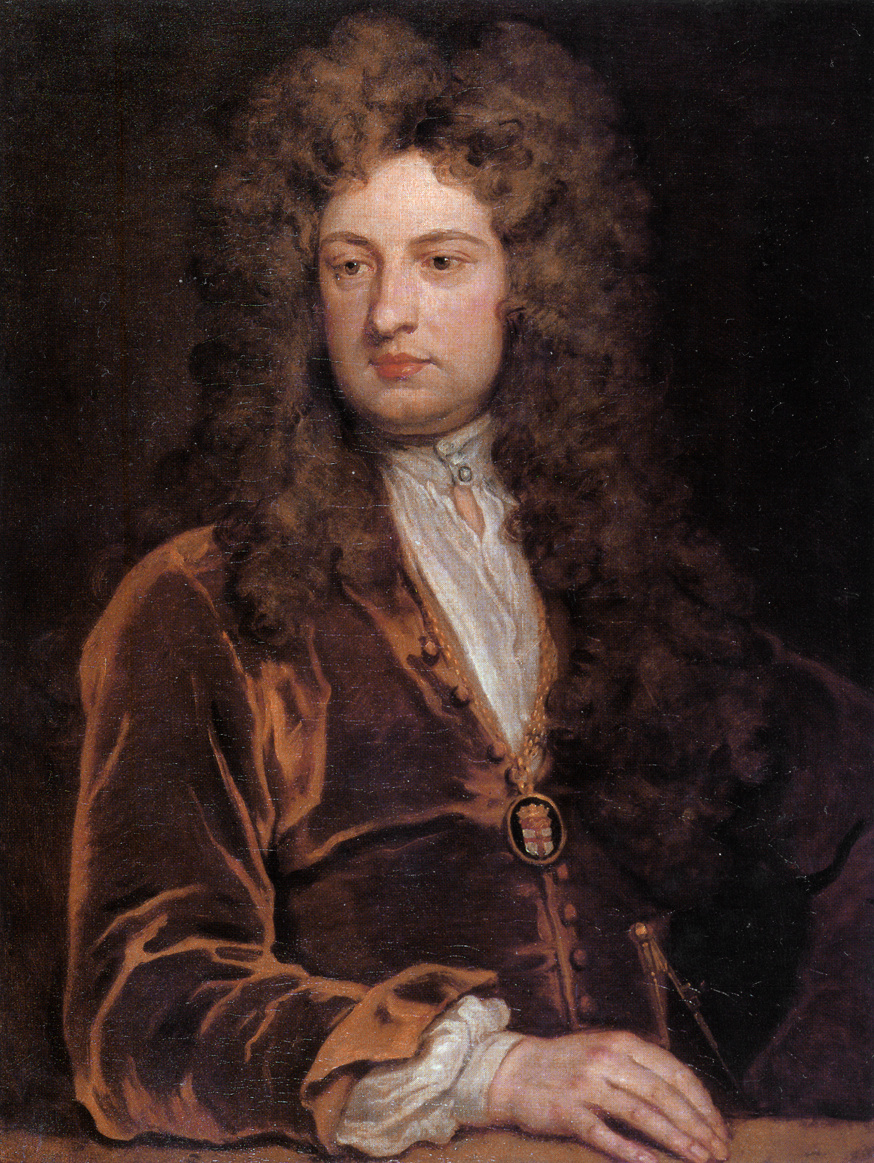
John Vanbrugh

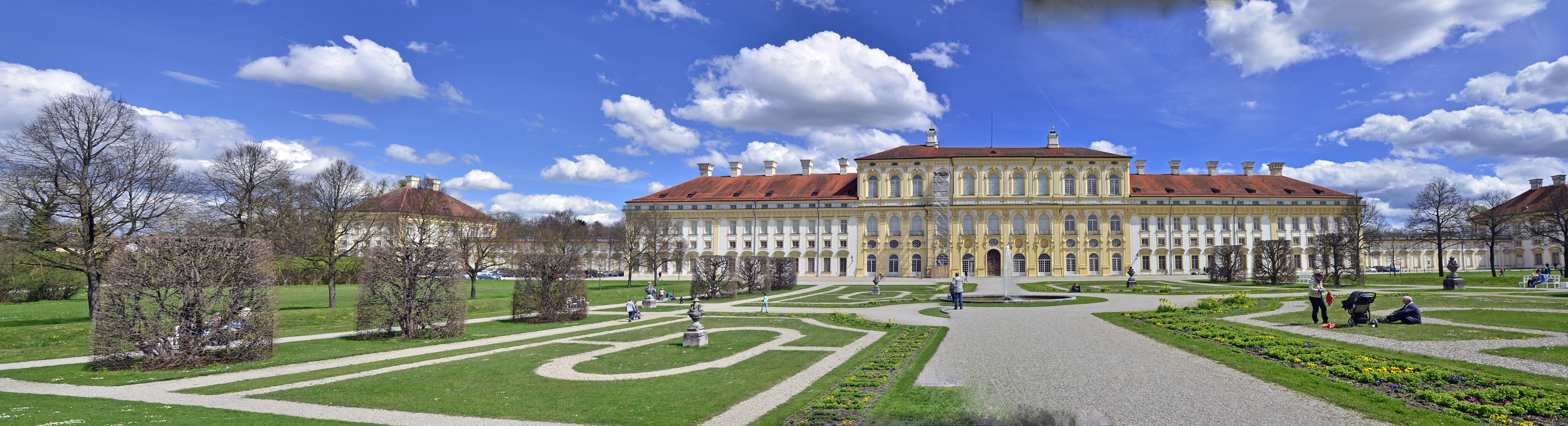
Schleissheim Palace

== Buildings and structures ==
=== Buildings ===
- English architect and dramatist John Vanbrugh is commissioned to begin Blenheim Palace.
- Schleissheim Palace near Munich in Bavaria, designed by Enrico Zuccalli, is completed.
- Cound Hall, Shropshire, England, designed by John Prince or Price, is completed.
- Burgh House, Hampstead, London is built.
- Church of the Ascension, Hall Green, Birmingham, England, probably designed by Sir William Wilson, is consecrated.
- Construction of Hirado Castle in Nagasaki (Japan) begins.
- Construction on Ludwigsburg Palace begins.

== Births ==
- March 6 (bapt.) – Isaac Ware, English architect (died 1766)
- August 26 (bapt.) – John Wood, the Elder, English architect working in Bath (died 1754)

== Deaths ==
- Paolo Falconieri, Florentine architect, painter and mathematician (born 1638)
