= 1844 in architecture =

The year 1844 in architecture involved some significant architectural events and new buildings.

== Buildings and structures ==
=== Buildings completed ===
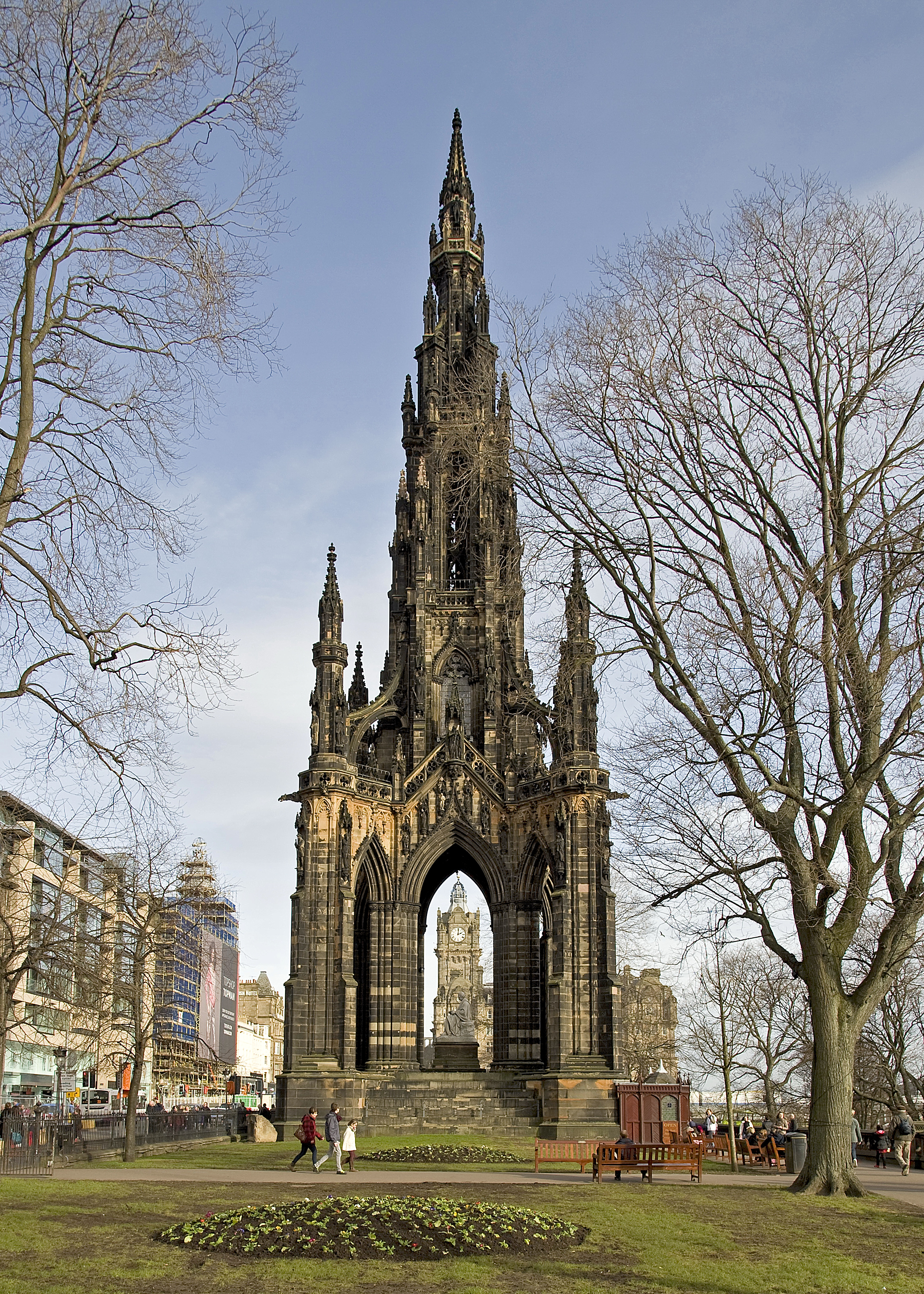
Scott Monument

- June 12 – Abingdon Road railway station near Culham on the line to Oxford in England, designed by I. K. Brunel.
- August 21 – St Mary's Church, Newcastle upon Tyne (Roman Catholic, later Cathedral) in England, designed by Augustus Pugin.
- August 27 – St Barnabas Church, Nottingham (Roman Catholic, later Cathedral) in England, designed by Augustus Pugin.
- October – The Grange, Ramsgate (house), designed for himself by Augustus Pugin.
- Autumn – The Scott Monument in Edinburgh, Scotland, designed by George Meikle Kemp.
- New buildings for Marischal College, Aberdeen, Scotland, designed by Archibald Simpson.
- Bell tower of Dormition Cathedral, Kharkiv, Ukraine.
- Berkshire County Gaol, Reading, England, designed by George Gilbert Scott with William Bonython Moffatt.
- Berry Hill, near Halifax, Virginia.

== Events ==
- July 27 – Vang Stave Church, relocated from Vang Municipality (in Oppland, Norway) to Brückenberg, Silesia, is reconsecrated.
- Eugène Viollet-le-Duc and Jean-Baptiste Lassus win a competition for the restoration of the cathedral of Notre-Dame de Paris.

== Awards ==
- Grand Prix de Rome, architecture: Prosper Desbuisson.

== Births ==
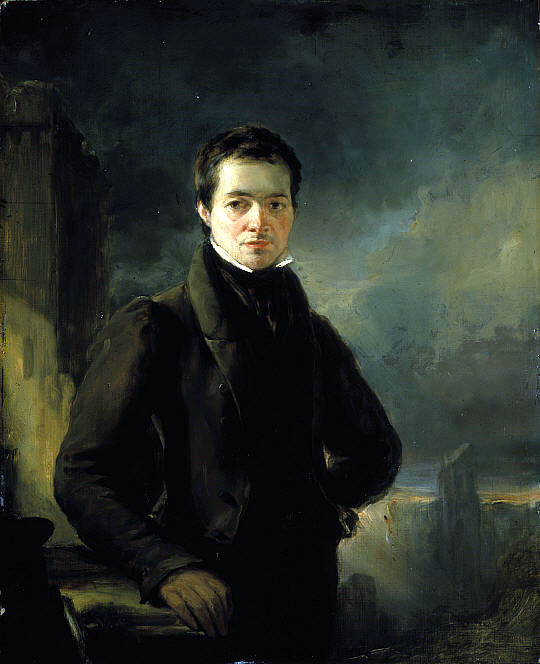
George Meikle Kemp

- January 3 – Hermann Eggert, German architect (died 1920)
- June 23 – Émile Bénard, French architect and painter (died 1929)
- July 3 – Dankmar Adler, German-born American architect (died 1900)

== Deaths ==
- March 6 – George Meikle Kemp, designer of the Scott Monument in Edinburgh (born 1795; drowned).
- April 15 – Charles Bulfinch, first native-born American to practice architecture as a profession (born 1763)
