= 1777 in architecture =

The year 1777 in architecture involved some significant architectural events and new buildings.

== Events ==
- April 21 – The foundation stone of Wesley's Chapel in London is laid.

== Buildings and structures ==
=== Buildings completed ===
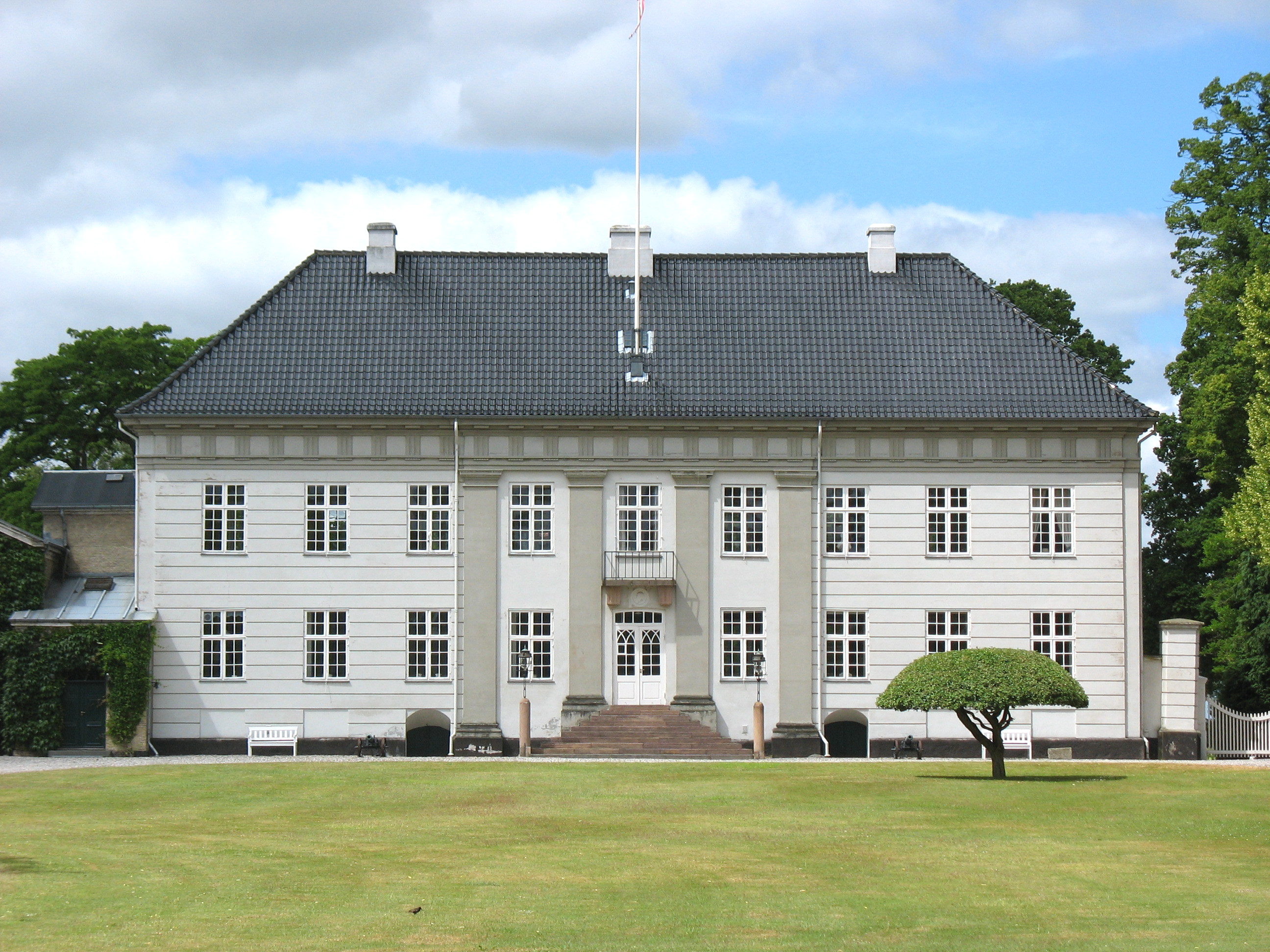
Corselitze

- Corselitze, Falster, Denmark, designed by Andreas Kirkerup.
- Drumcar House, Ireland.
- Reformed Church, Lompirt, Romania.
- Rococo-Classicist Roman Catholic Church in Malý Kiar, The Glorification of the Saint Cross.
- Wenvoe Castle, Vale of Glamorgan, the only building in Wales designed by Robert Adam.
- Home House, Portman Square, London, completed to the design of Robert Adam.
- Richmond Bridge, London (across the River Thames), designed by James Paine and Kenton Couse.

== Births ==
- February 13 – James Trubshaw, English builder, architect and civil engineer. (died 1853)
- September 9 — John Holden Greene, American architect based in Providence, Rhode Island (died 1850)
- October 11 – Fop Smit, Dutch architect, shipbuilder, and shipowner (died 1866)

== Deaths ==
- March 3 – Sir Thomas Robinson, 1st Baronet, English nobleman and amateur architect (born c.1703)
- December 23 – Thomas Farnolls Pritchard, British architect and interior designer (born 1723)
