= 1825 in architecture =

The year 1825 in architecture involved some significant architectural events and new buildings.

== Events ==
- The front and rear porticoes of The White House are added to the building.

== Buildings and structures ==
=== Buildings completed ===
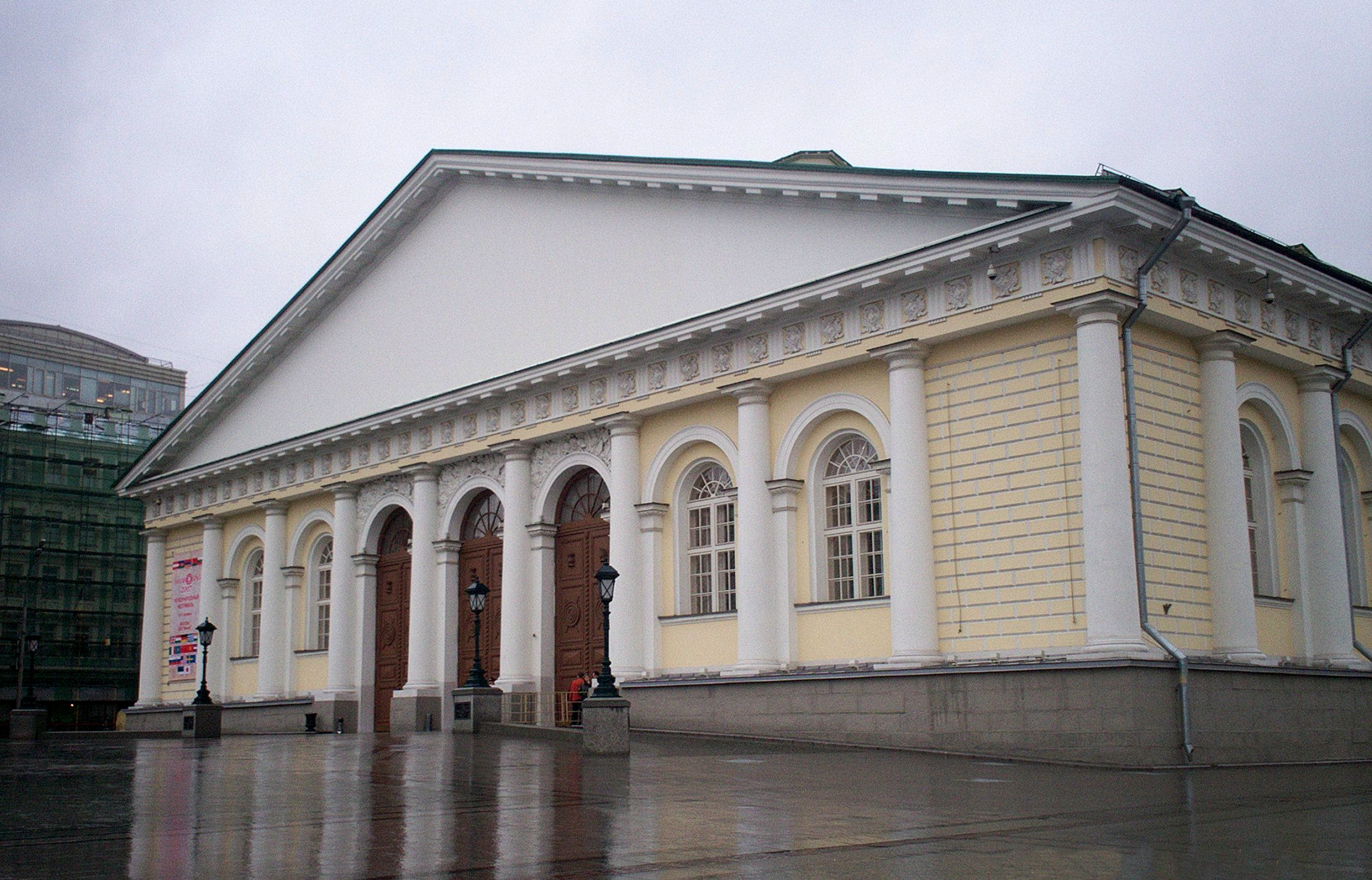
The Moscow Manege, Russia

- Moscow Manege, Moscow, Russia, designed by Agustín de Betancourt.
- Tuskulėnai Manor in Vilnius by Karol Podczaszyński.
- Palais Brongniart, the Paris Bourse, completed posthumously to the designs of Alexandre-Théodore Brongniart.
- City Hall in Karlsruhe (Baden), designed by Friedrich Weinbrenner.
- St Peter's Church, Walworth, London, designed by John Soane.

== Births ==
- July 14 – Adolf Cluss, German-born architect in Washington, D.C. (died 1905)
- August 7 – Jacob Wrey Mould, New York architect, illustrator, linguist and musician (died 1886)
- October 22 – Friedrich von Schmidt, Austrian architect based in Vienna (died 1891)
- November 6 – Charles Garnier, French architect (died 1898)
- date unknown
  - James Brooks, English Gothic Revival architect (died 1901)
  - William White, English Gothic Revival architect (died 1900)

== Deaths ==
- June 14 – Pierre Charles L'Enfant, French-born US architect and civil engineer (born 1754)
