= 1740 in architecture =

The year 1740 in architecture involved some significant events.

== Events ==
- In Ballymena (Ireland), the original Ballymena Castle burns down.

== Buildings and structures ==
=== Buildings ===
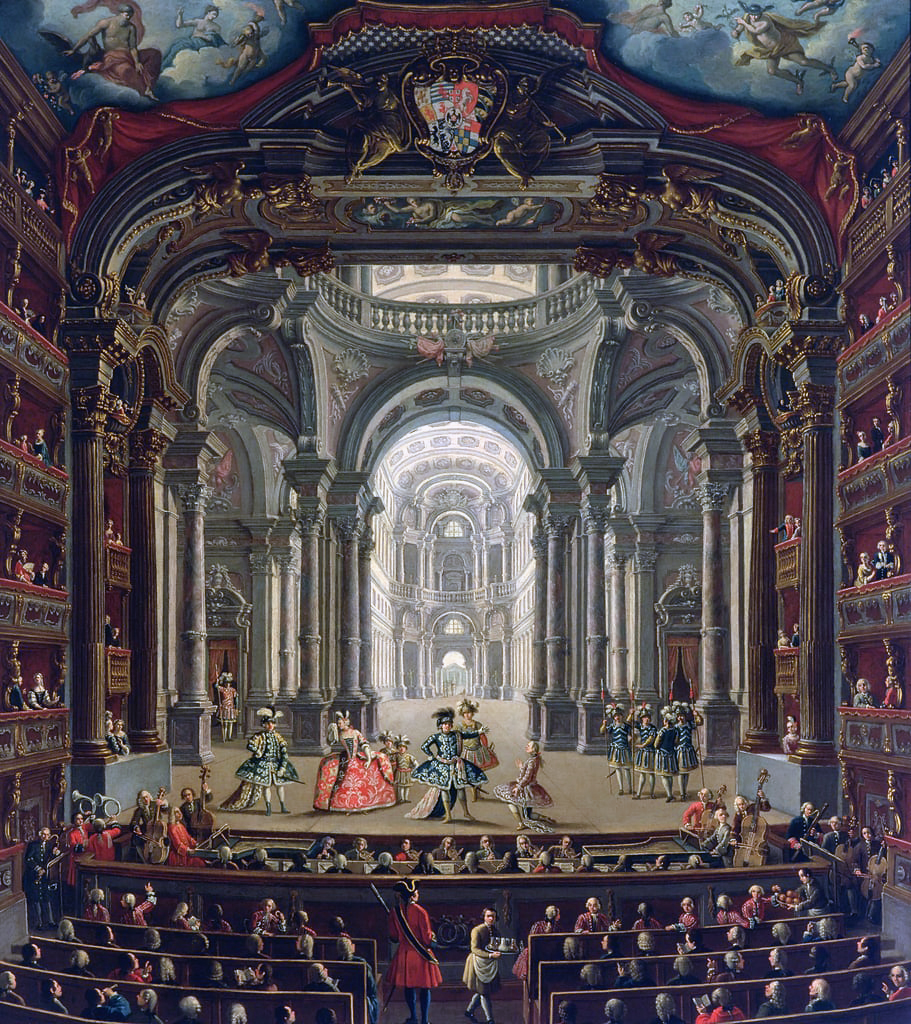
Teatro Regio (Turin)

- Teatro Regio (Turin) opened.
- Teatro di Santa Maria, Florence built.
- Falkenlust Palace, Brühl, Germany, completed.
- Château d'Hérouville, France, designed by Gaudot, built.
- Duff House in Banff, Scotland, designed by William Adam, is completed.
- In Boston, Massachusetts, Faneuil Hall, the covered market, is built by Huguenot merchant Pierre Faneuil.
- Old Library, Bristol, probably designed by James Paty the Elder, built.
- Örskär lighthouse, Sweden, rebuilt in stone to the design of Carl Hårleman.
- South Wing of St Bartholomew's Hospital, London, designed by James Gibbs, built.
- Saint Sampson's Cathedral, Saint Petersburg, designed by Pietro Antonio Trezzini, consecrated
- Old First Presbyterian Church (Wilmington, Delaware) built.
- Chaurasi Khambon ki Chhatri, Bundi, Rajasthan, built.
- In Philadelphia, the house which will become known as Betsy Ross House is built.
- Church of Santa María de Loreto, Achao on the Chiloé Archipelago completed by about this date.

== Births ==
- Thomas Cooley, English-born architect working in Ireland (died 1784)

== Deaths ==
- Antonio Montauti, Italian sculptor, medallist and possible architect (born 1685)
- Approximate date – John Strahan, English architect
