= 1703 in architecture =

The year 1703 in architecture involved some significant architectural events and new buildings.

== Events ==
- February 3 – Severe earthquake in L'Aquila damages many buildings.

== Buildings and structures ==
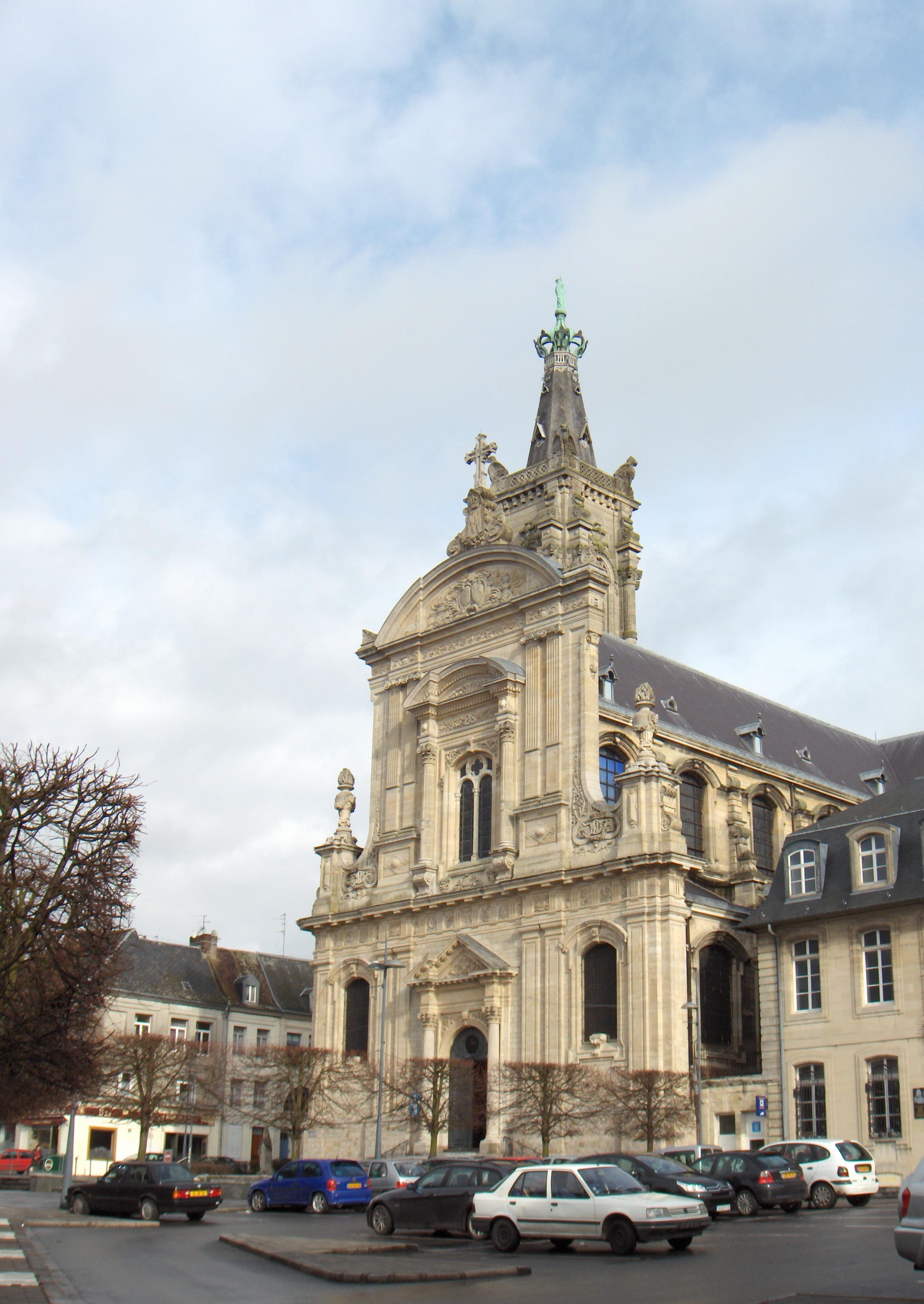
Cambrai Cathedral

=== Buildings completed ===
- May – Cabin of Peter the Great, built in three days by soldiers of the Semyonovsky Regiment.
- Cambrai Cathedral, France
- La Merced Cloister designed and constructed as part of a monastery in Mexico City by Juan de Herrera
- Stavenhagenhaus, Hamburg, Germany (dated from the arms above the main entrance door)
- Approximate date – Church of St. Anne, Kraków, Poland, designed by Tylman van Gameren, is completed

== Births ==
- February – Robert Morris, English architect and writer on architecture (died 1754)
- October 13 – Andrea Belli, Maltese architect and businessman (died 1772)
- December 11 – Giovanni Antonio Medrano, Italian architect (died 1760)
- Approximate date – Sir Thomas Robinson, 1st Baronet, English nobleman and amateur architect (d. 1777)

== Deaths ==
- February 16 – Lorenzo Gafà, Maltese Baroque architect and sculptor (born 1639)
- March 3 – Robert Hooke, English natural philosopher, architect and polymath (born 1635)
- December 27 – Thomas Cartwright, English architect (born c.1635)
