= Reformed Church, Lompirt =

Church in Lompirt, Romania

Reformed Church in Lompirt _{Református templom}
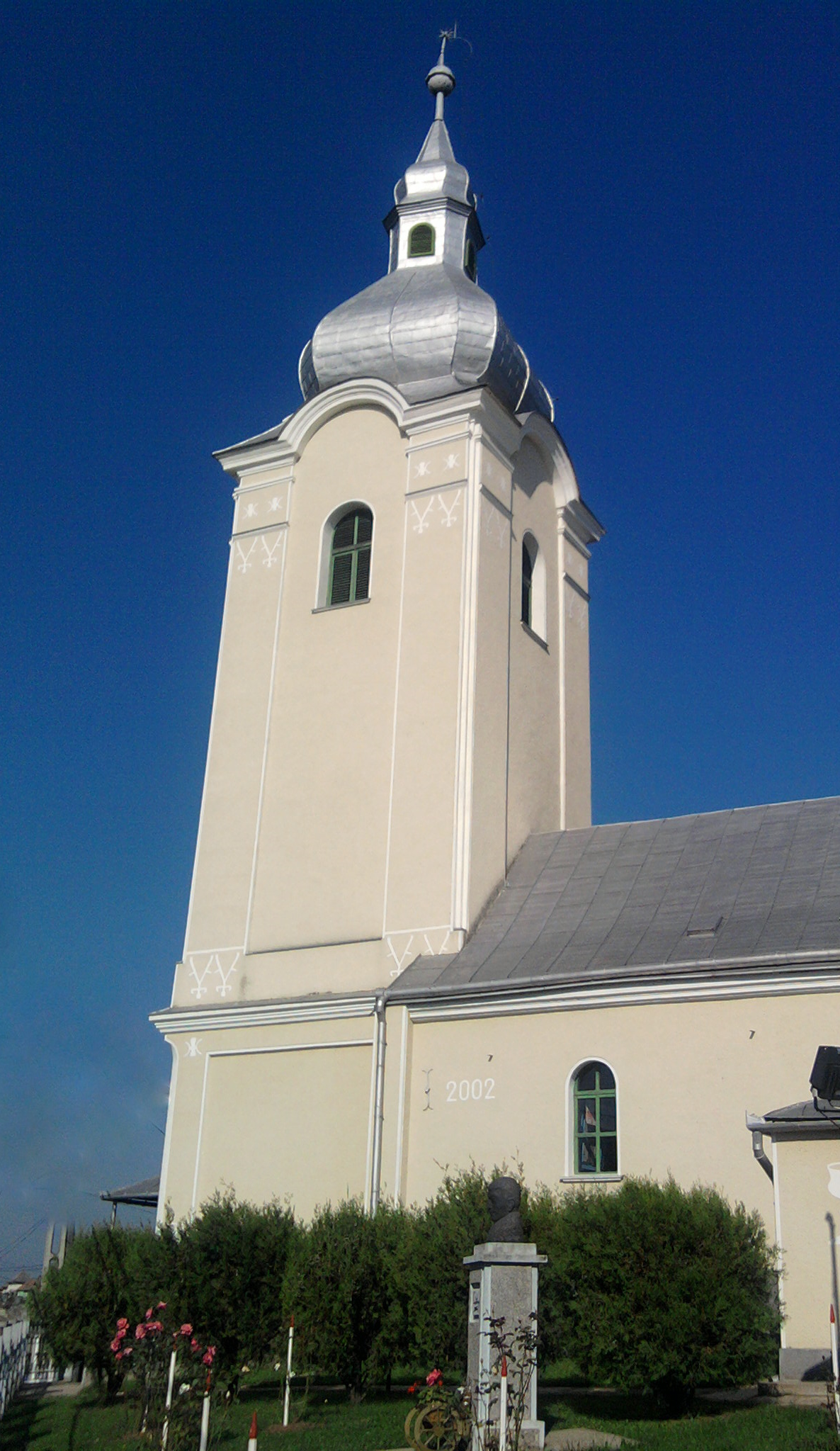

- Romania

Religion
- Affiliation: Reformed Church in Romania
- Region: Sălaj County
- Ecclesiastical or organizational status: parish church
- Year consecrated: 1777

Location
- Location: Lompirt
- Municipality: Lompirt
- State: Romania
- Interactive map of Reformed Church in Lompirt _{Református templom}
- Coordinates: 47.32307°N 22.84356°E

The Reformed Church (Romanian: Biserica Reformată; Hungarian: Református templom) is a church in Lompirt, Romania, completed in 1777.

== Gallery ==
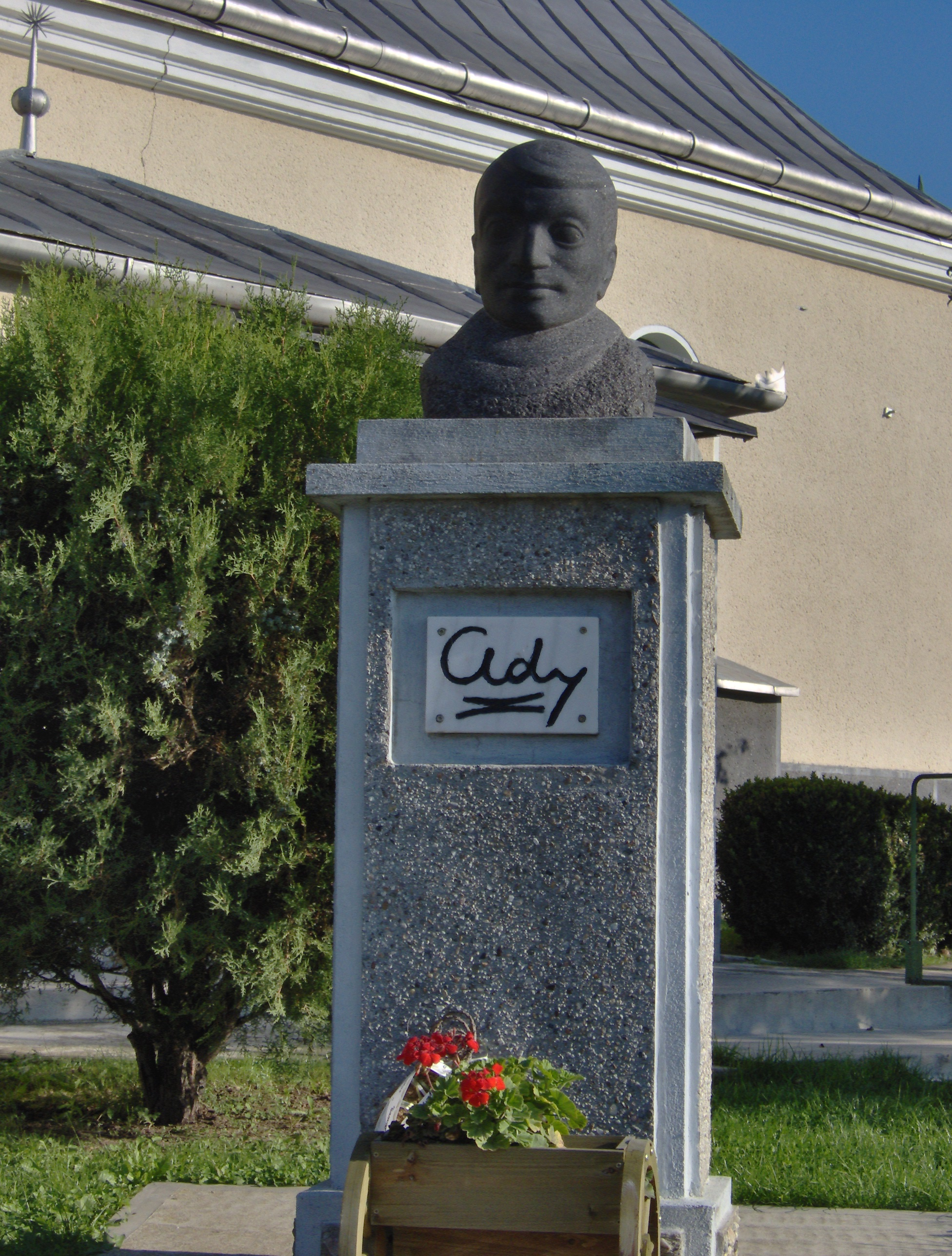
Endre Ady in front of the church

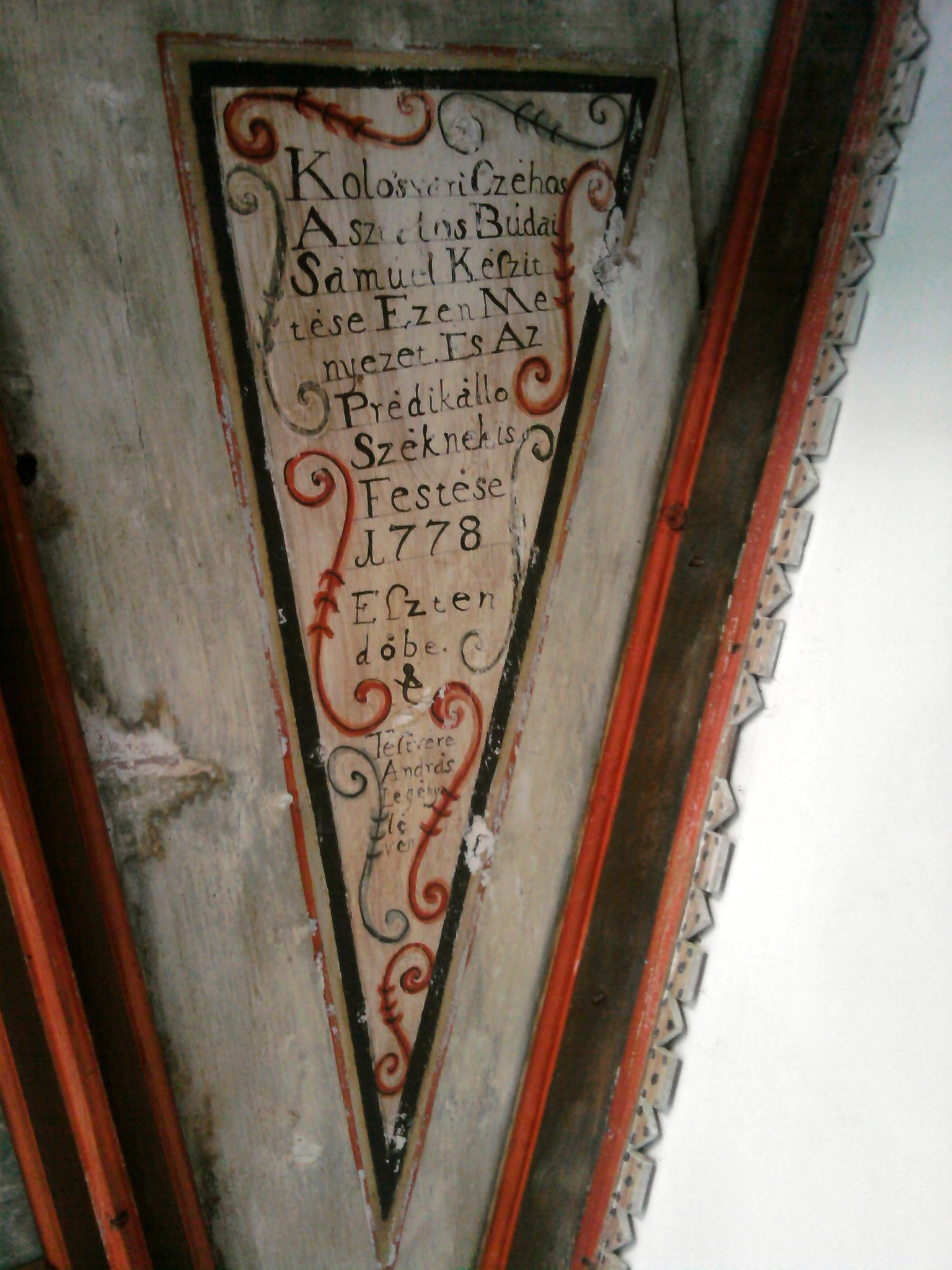

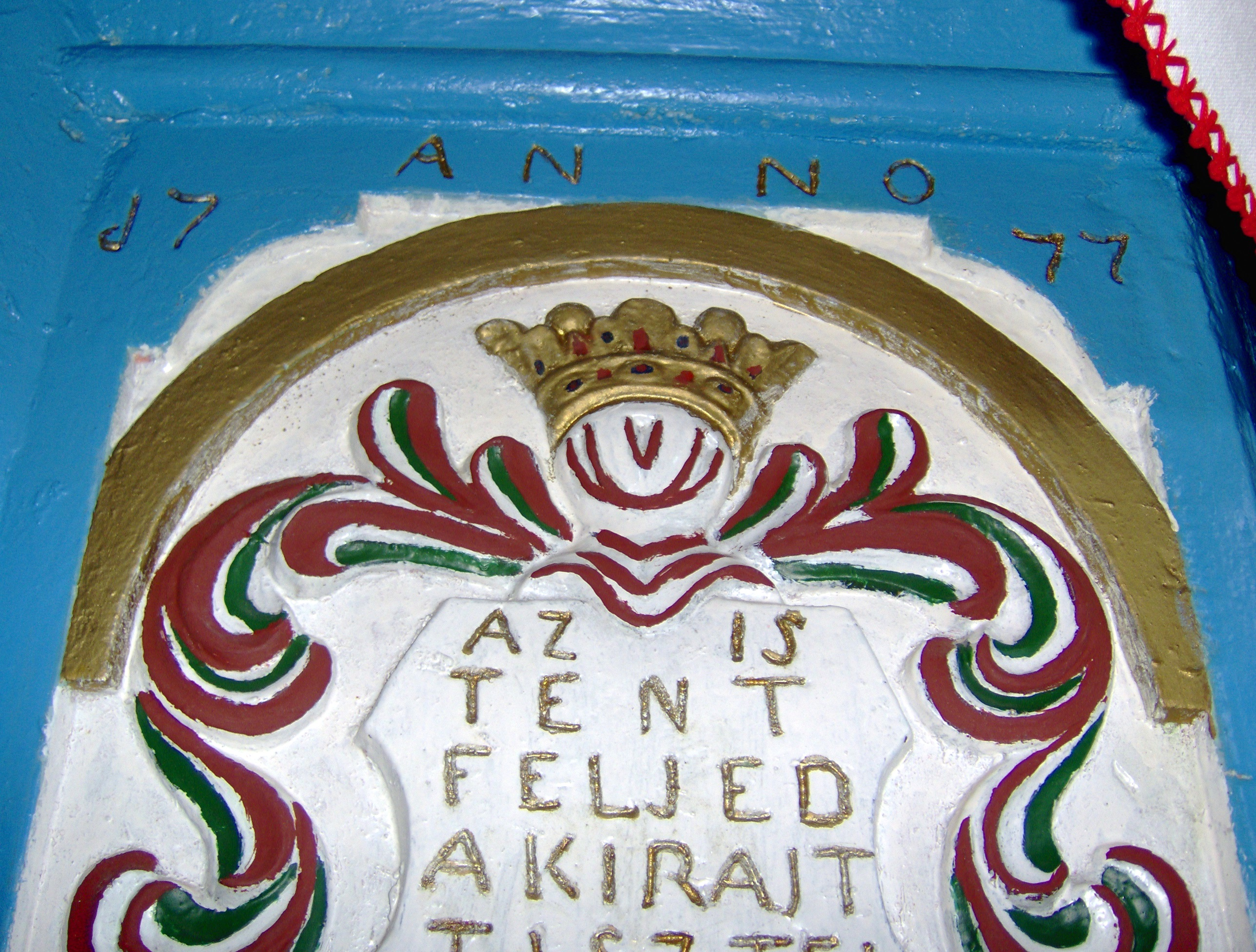

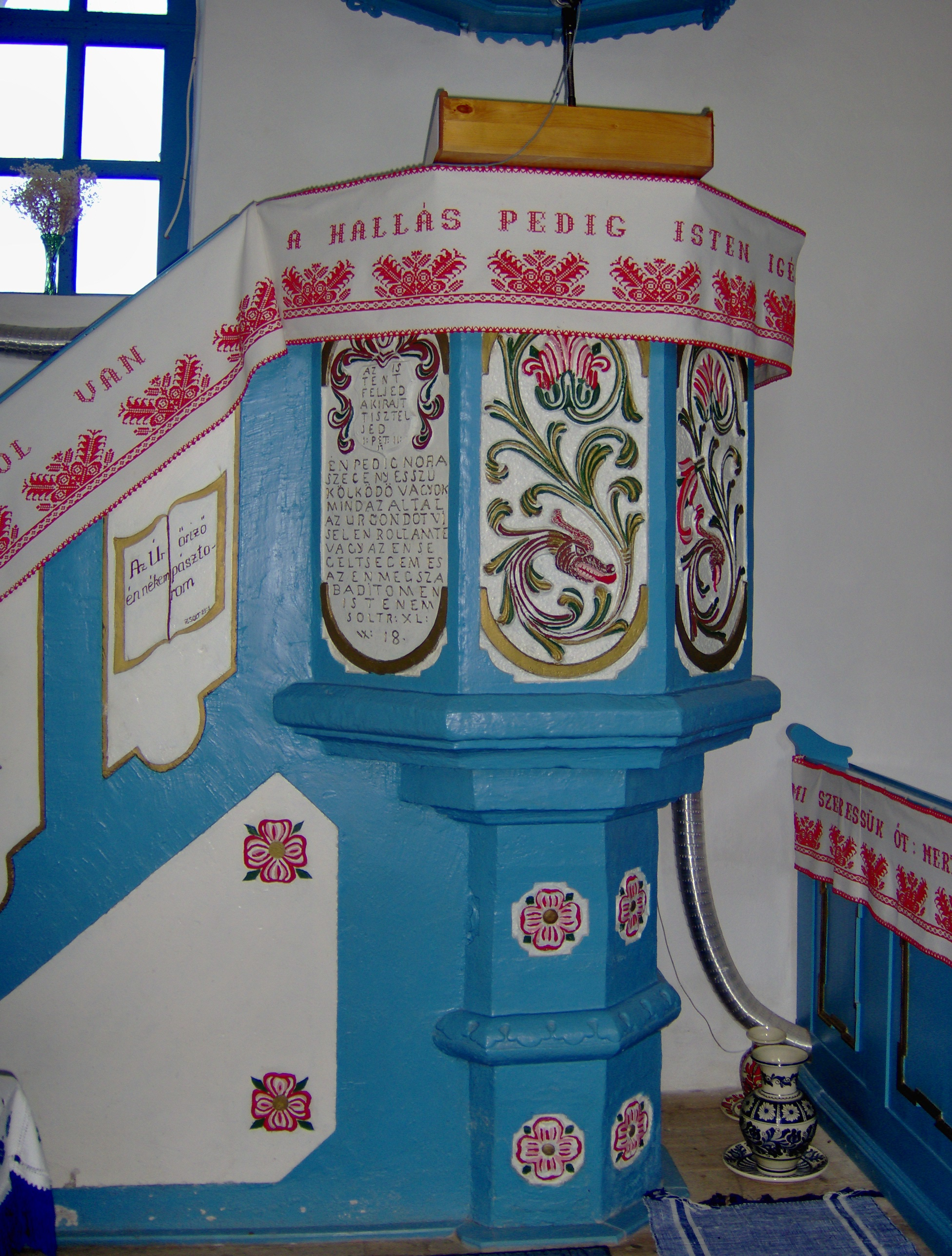

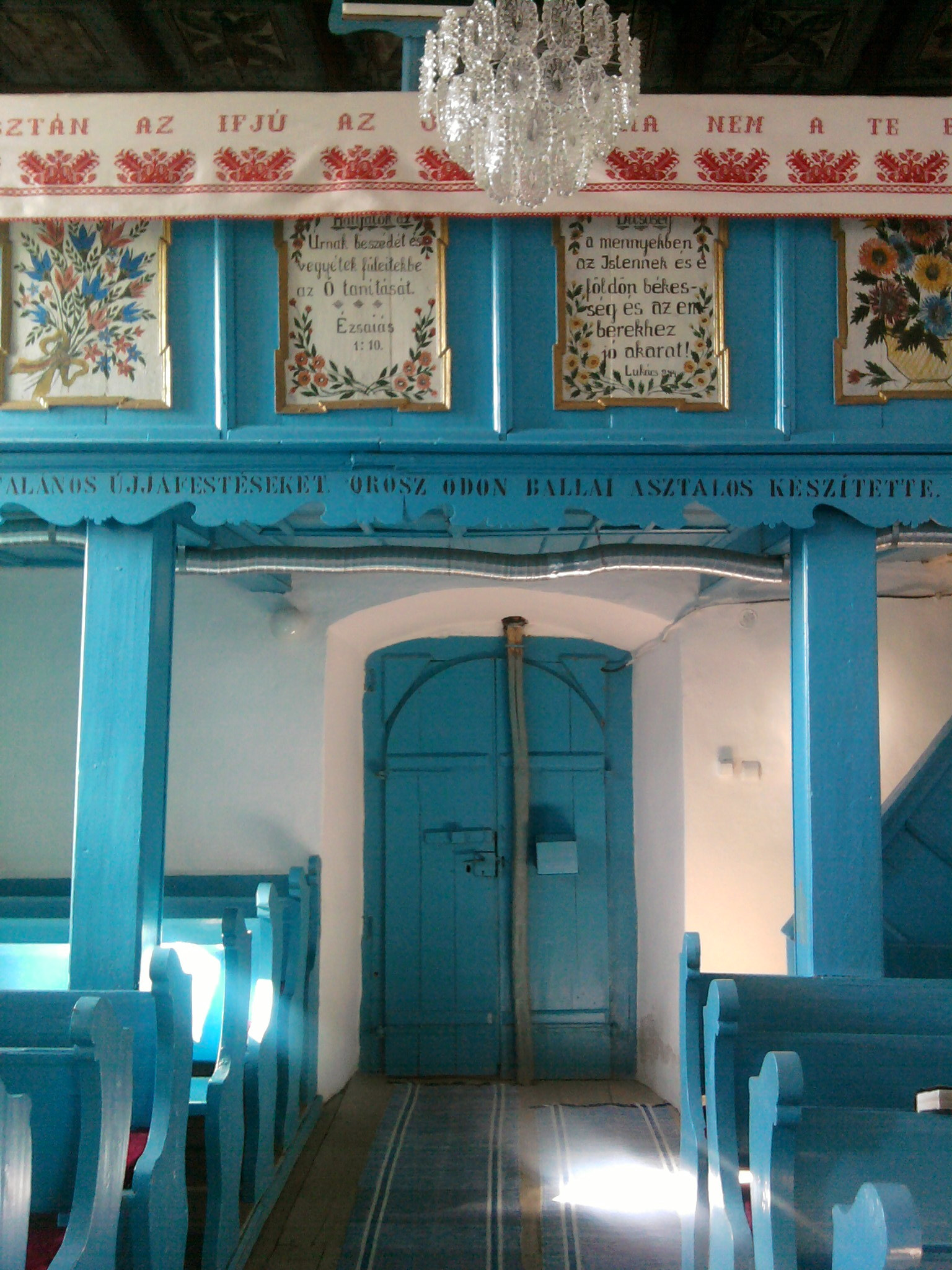

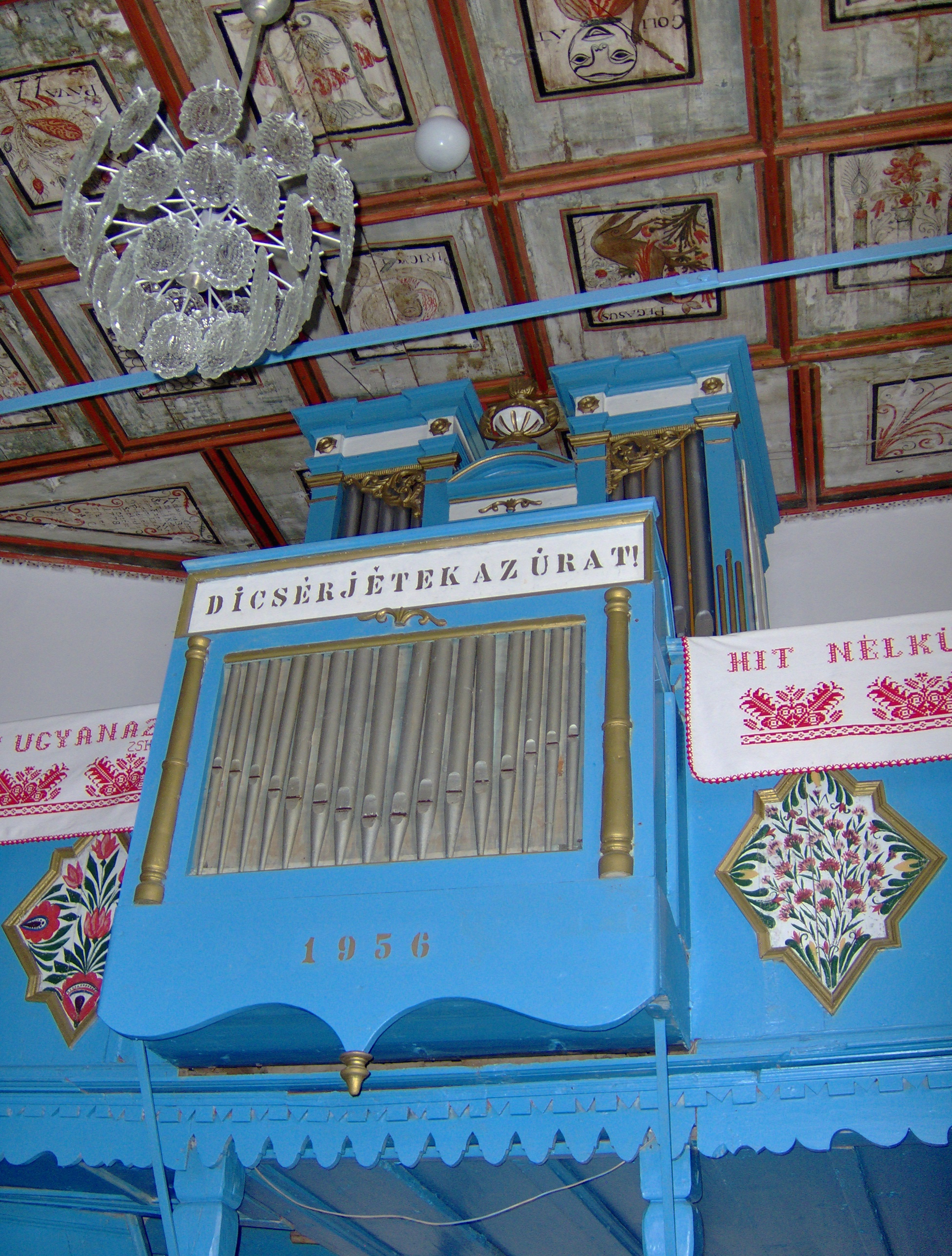

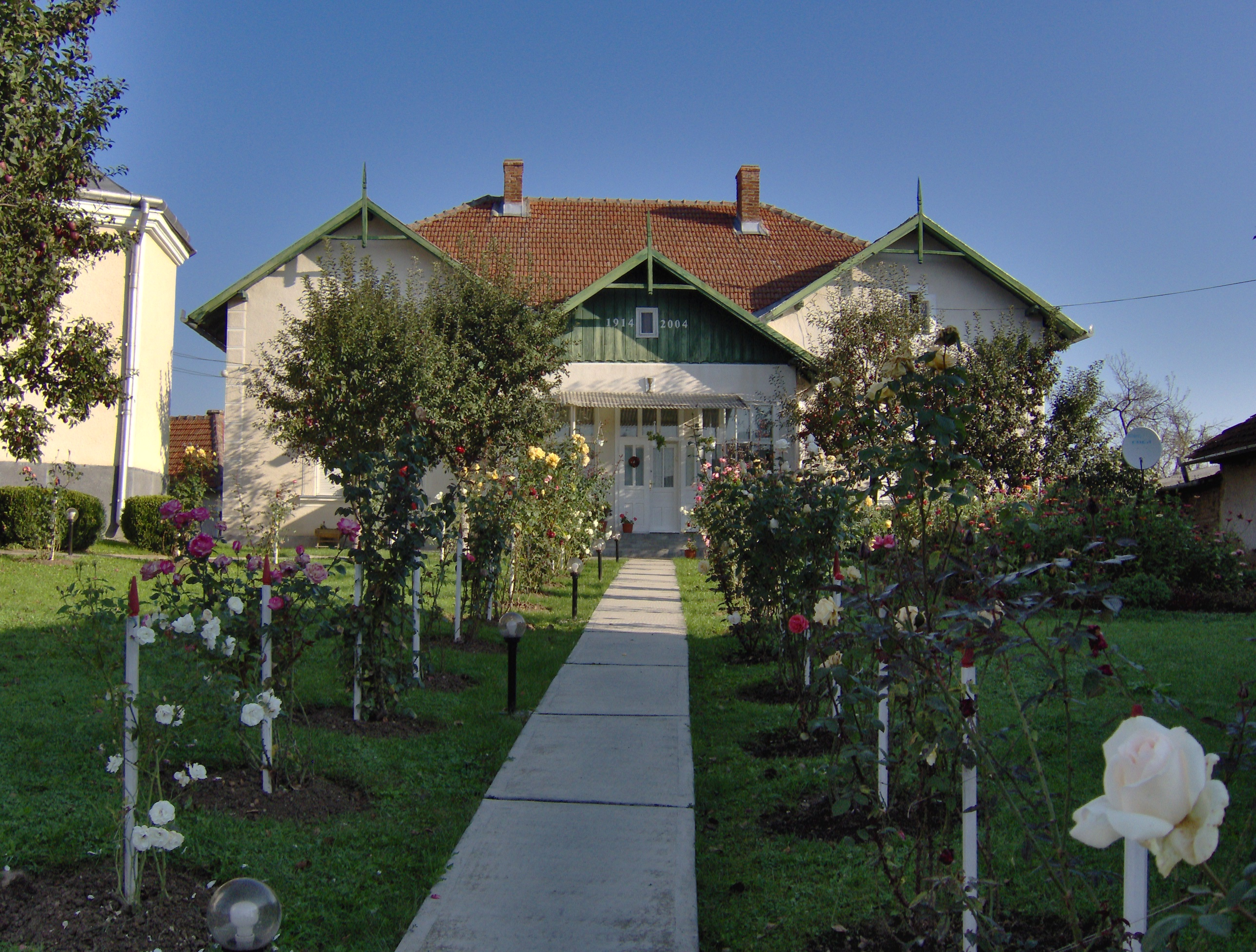
The rectory

== Bibliography ==
- Szilágylompért, szerkesztő Szőnyi Levente, 2009, Color Print Nyomda, Zilah, ISBN 978-973-0-07055-2
