= Charles Étienne Briseux =

French architect

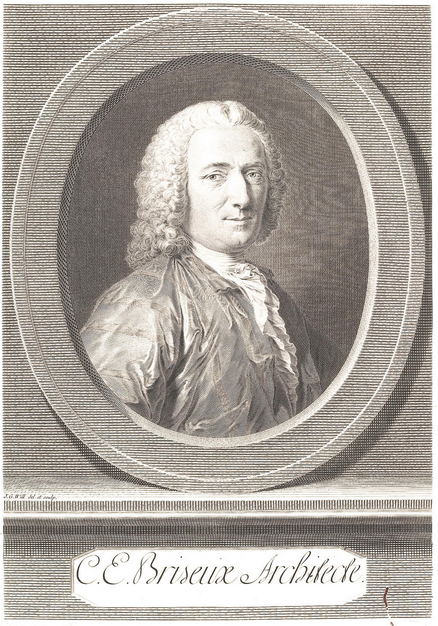

Charles-Etienne Briseux (c. 1680-1754) was a French architect.

He was especially successful as a designer of internal decorations, mantel pieces, mirrors, doors and overdoors, ceilings, consoles, candelabra, wall panellings and other fittings, chiefly in the Louis Quinze mode. He was also an industrious writer on architectural subjects.

== Works ==
His principal works are:

- L'Architecture moderne (2 vols., 1728).
- L'Art de bâtir les maisons de campagne (2 vols., 1743).
- Traité du beau essentiel dans les arts, appliqué particulièrement à l'architecture (1752).
- Traité des proportions harmoniques.
