= Benjamin Cole House =

Historic house in Massachusetts, United States

- U.S. National Register of Historic Places
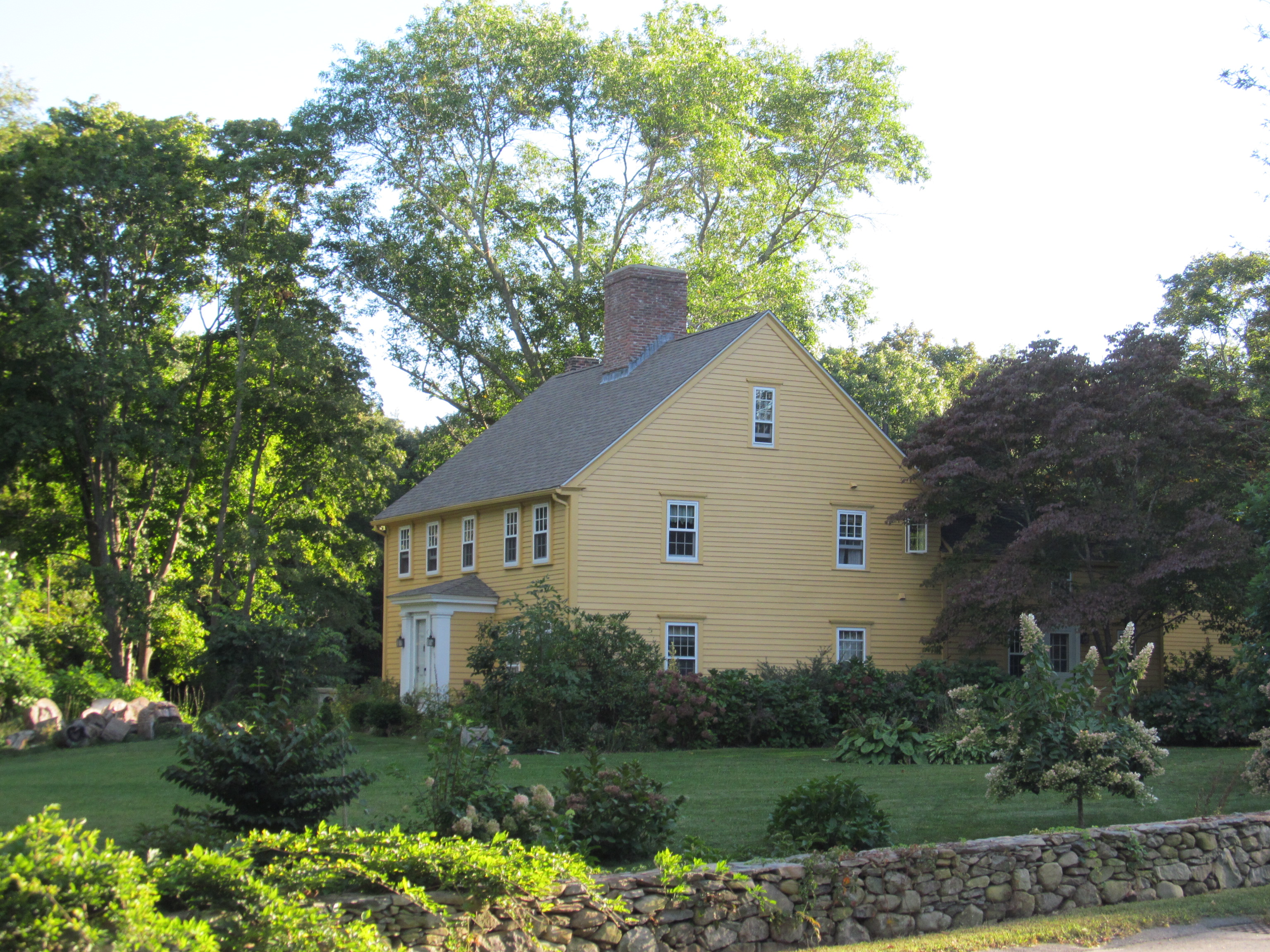
- Benjamin Cole House

- Location within Massachusetts Location within the United States
- Location: 412 Old Warren Rd., Swansea, Massachusetts
- Coordinates: 41°44′31″N 71°13′57″W
- Area: 4 acres (1.6 ha)
- Built: 1690–1701
- Architectural style: Georgian, Colonial
- MPS: Swansea MRA
- NRHP reference No.: 90000066
- Added to NRHP: February 16, 1990

The Benjamin Cole House is a historic house in Swansea, Massachusetts, United States. Built in 1690, this house is the oldest documented building in Swansea.

== Description and history ==
The Cole house is set on the south side of Old Warren Road, a historic early road through what is now southwestern Swansea. It is a 2 1/2-story, wood-framed structure, five bays wide, with a side gable roof and a large central chimney. The exterior has Federal-period styling (probably added in the late 18th century), and an ell, built c. 1850, extends to the rear of the main block. The main entrance is set in a projecting hip-roofed vestibule, which is decorated with corner pilasters. Outbuildings of the property include a barn (c. 1890) and garage (c. 1950).

Benjamin Cole, who built the house, was the grandson of James Cole, who was the first of the Coles to come to North America, and for whom Cole's Hill in Plymouth is named. It continued to be the center of a major farmstead into the 20th century, operated for many years by the Wilbur family.

The house was listed on the National Register of Historic Places on February 16, 1990.

== See also ==
- National Register of Historic Places listings in Bristol County, Massachusetts
