= Joseph Moretti =

- Born: 1700; Milan
- Died: May 1, 1793 (aged 92–93); Aachen
- Occupations: architect, surveyor

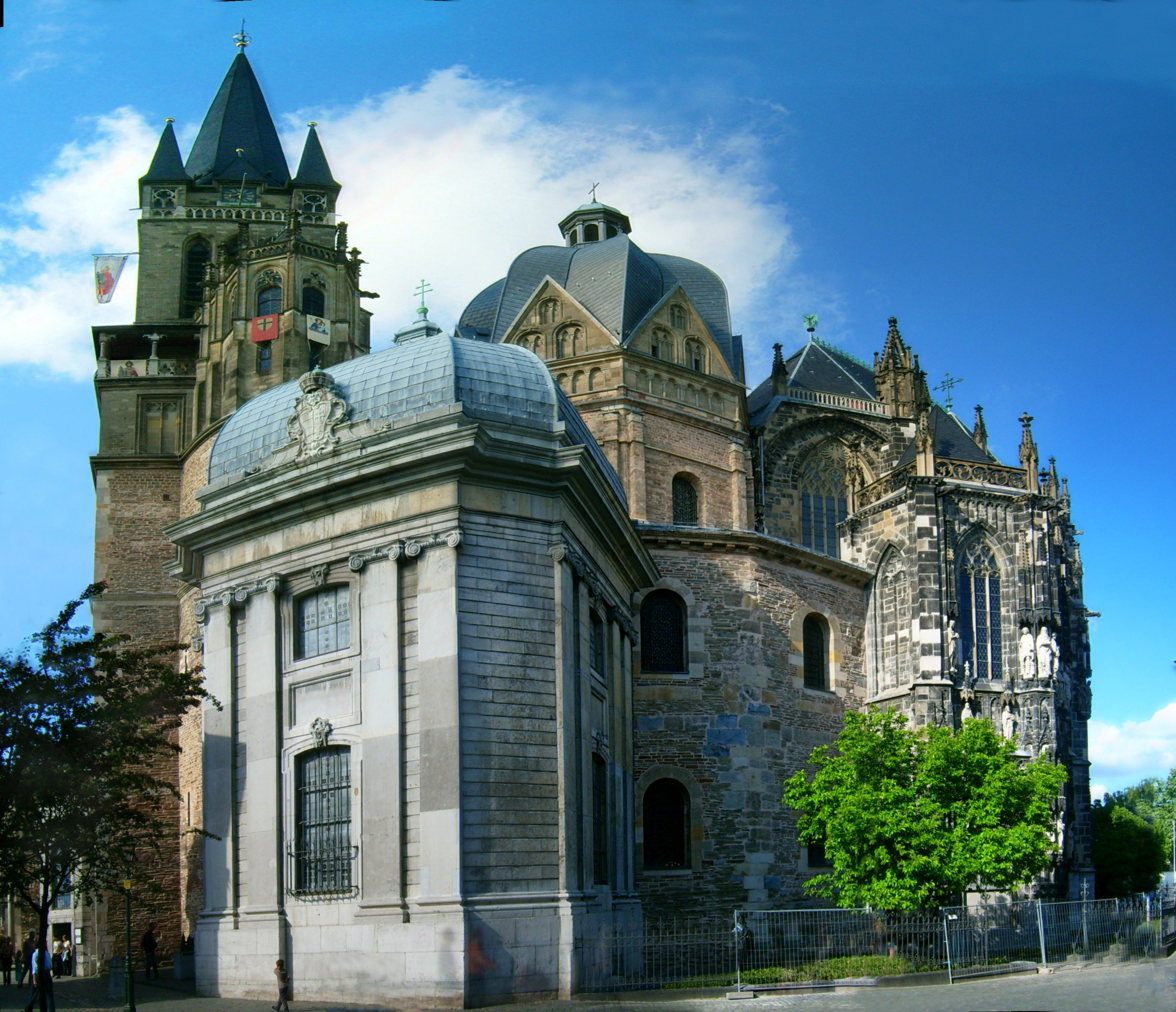
Aachener Dom Vom Muensterplatz

Joseph Moretti (died 1 May 1793) was a German architect of Italian birth of the late baroque era. Born in Milan, he primarily worked in the cities of Aachen, Liège, and Maastricht. His first important design was the design for the library at the Rolduc in the rococo style. He also designed the west chapel of the Aachen Cathedral.

== Sources ==
- Marcel Bauer, Frank Eindhoven, Anke Kappler, Belinda Petri, Christine Vogt, Anke Volkmer, Unterwegs auf Couvens Spuren. Eupen (ISBN 90-5433-187-9)

1776 House & parc Clermont(Blumenthal) Bloemendalstraat 26, Vaals, The Netherlands
