= 1705 in architecture =

The year 1705 in architecture involved some significant events.

== Buildings and structures ==
=== Buildings ===
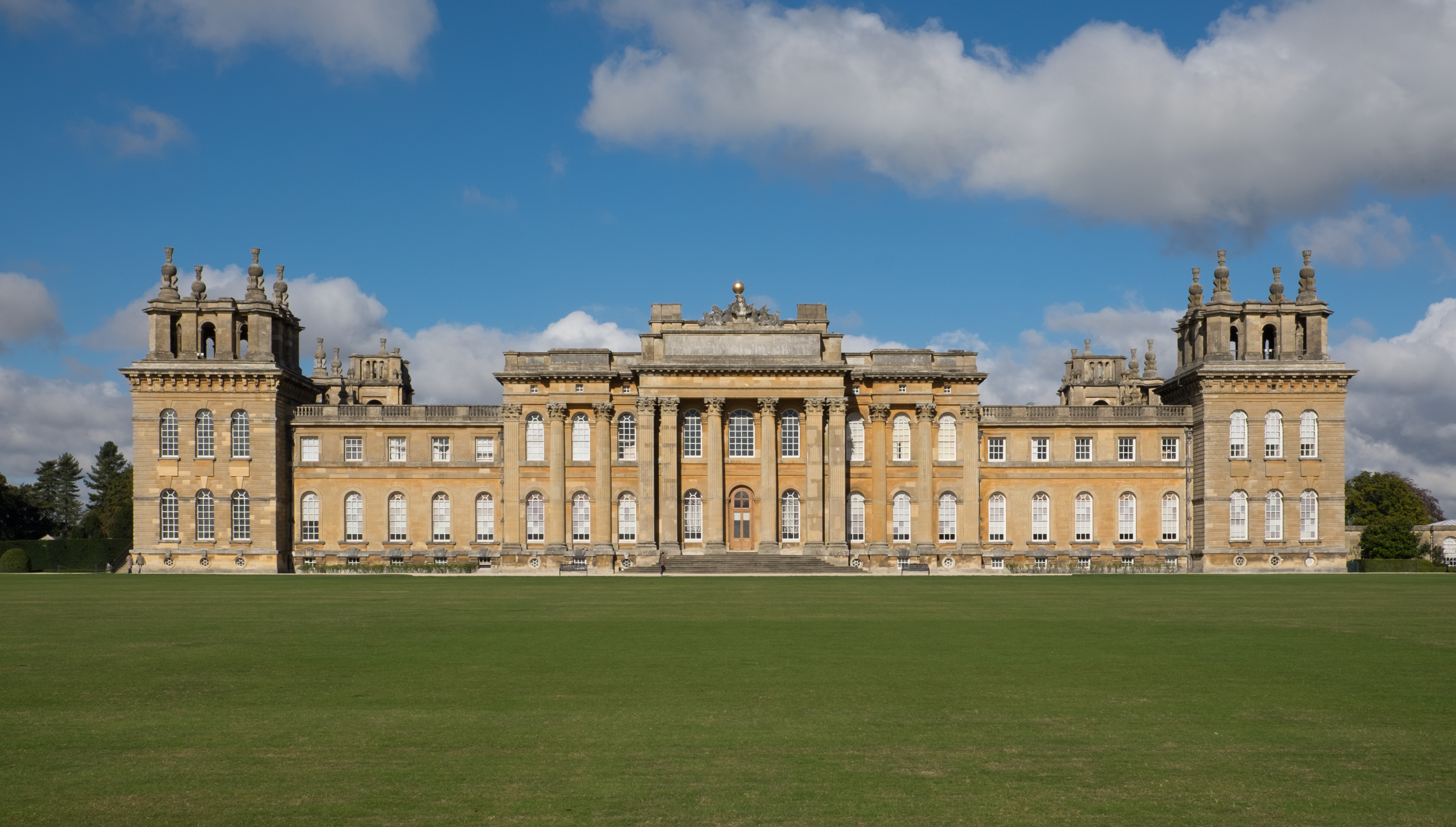
Blenheim Palace at Woodstock, Oxfordshire, England

- March – The first of the principal buildings of Greenwich Hospital, London, the King Charles Court, designed by Christopher Wren, is completed.
- November – In Williamsburg, capital of the Virginia colony in America, construction of the first Capitol building is completed.
- Blenheim Palace is begun at Woodstock, Oxfordshire, England, designed by John Vanbrugh (completed 1722).
- The Stadtpalais Liechtenstein in Vienna, Austria, is completed (started 1692).
- Remodelling of the Jesuit Church, Vienna, by Andrea Pozzo is largely completed.

== Births ==
- January 8 – Jacques-François Blondel, French architect (died 1774)
- Charles Labelye, Swiss civil engineer (died 1762)
- Approximate date – Richard Taliaferro, American architect working in Williamsburg, Virginia (died 1779)

== Deaths ==
- Lady Elizabeth Wilbraham, English amateur architect (born 1632)
