= Johann Joseph Couven =

German Baroque architect

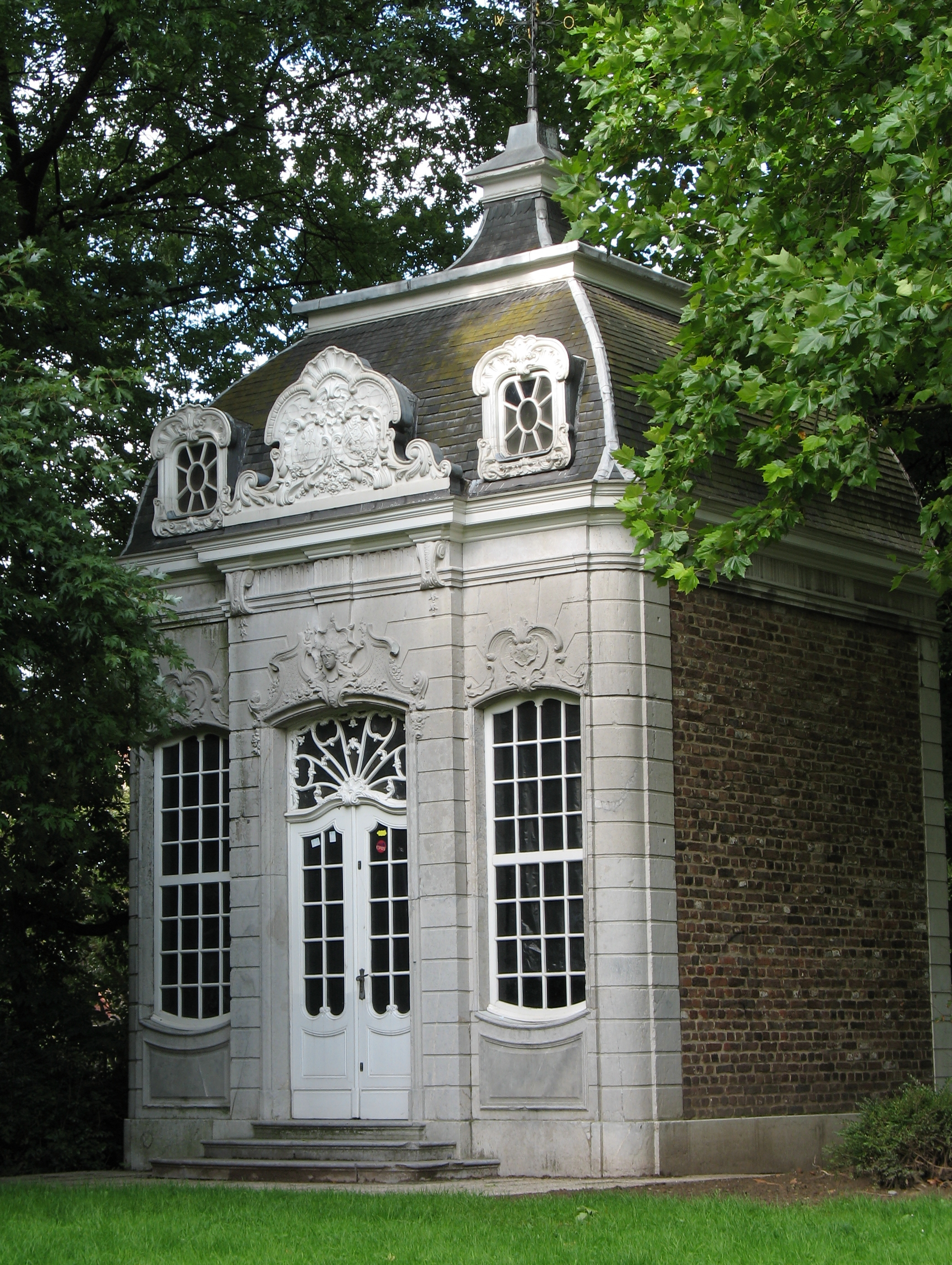
Pavilion, constructed by Johann Joseph Couven, in the spa garden of Aachen-Burtscheid

Johann Joseph Couven (10 November 1701 – 12 September 1763) was a German Baroque architect. He was born in Aachen, where he also died. His legacy includes several religious and secular buildings in Germany (mostly in or near Aachen, e.g. Burtscheid Abbey church), Belgium (a.o. in Eupen and Liège) and the Netherlands (in Vaals, Houthem-Sint Gerlach and Oud-Valkenburg).
