= 1630s in architecture =

== Buildings and structures ==
=== Buildings ===
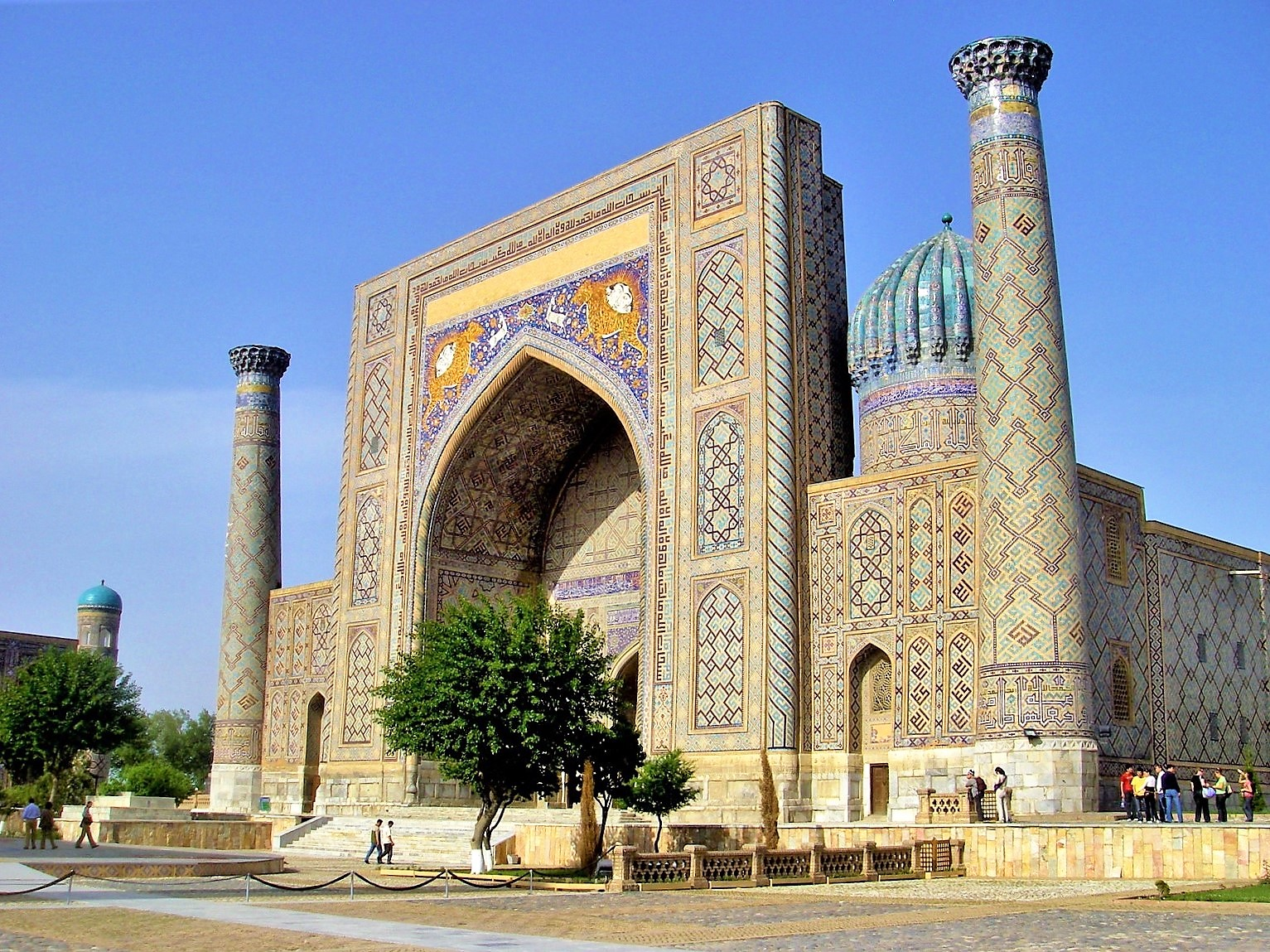
The Sherdar Madrasa, Samarkand

- 1630s – Tomb of Ali Mardan Khan in Lahore is built.
- 1630–1631 – Church of San Caio in Rome rebuilt by Francesco Peparelli and Vincenzo della Greca.
- 1630–1635 – The Pearl Mosque at Lahore Fort is built.
- 1631 – Work starts on the basilica of Santa Maria della Salute in Venice, designed by Baldassare Longhena.
- 1632
  - College chapel of Peterhouse, Cambridge, England, is consecrated.
  - Work starts on the Taj Mahal, probably designed by Ustad Ahmad Lahauri.
- 1633
  - Completion of the Palazzo Barberini in Rome by Gian Lorenzo Bernini (begun 1627 by Maderno).
  - Reconstruction of the Great Synagogue of Vilna completed.
  - Completion of St Columb's Cathedral, Derry, Ireland, designed by William Parrott, the first post-Reformation Anglican cathedral built in the British Isles and the first Protestant cathedral built in Europe.
  - St Paul's, Covent Garden, designed by Inigo Jones, opened to worship, the first wholly new church built in London since the English Reformation.
  - Kiyomizu-dera Buddhist temple in eastern Kyoto, Japan, built.
  - Grange Court in Leominster, England, built by John Abel.
- 1634–1635 – House for Constantijn Huygens on the Binnenhof in The Hague (Dutch Republic), designed by Jacob van Campen with the client, is built.
- 1635
  - Canterbury Quadrangle at St John's College, Oxford, England, the first example of Italian Renaissance architecture in the city, is completed.
  - The Radziwiłł Palace, Vilnius, is begun.

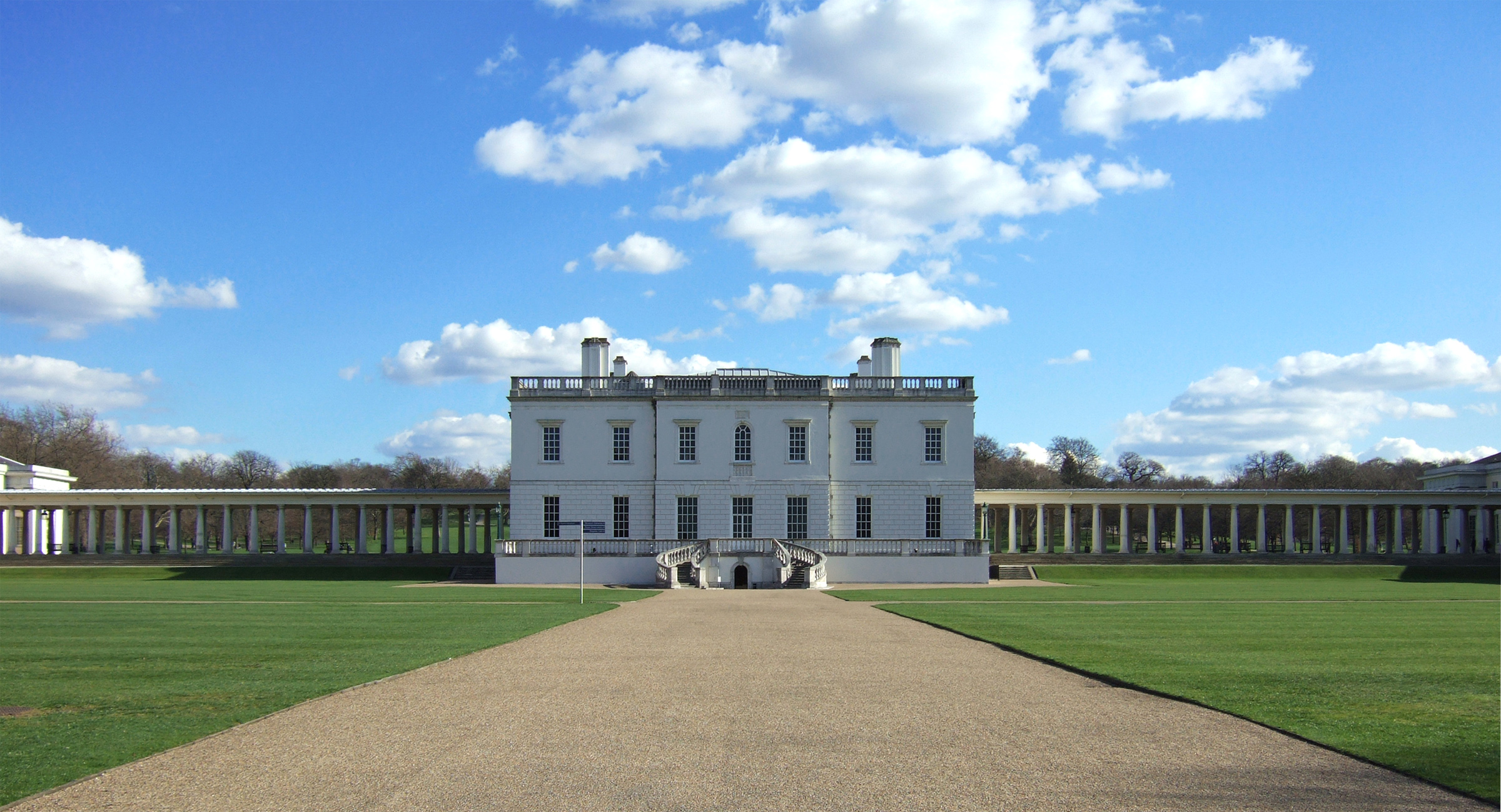
Queen's House, Greenwich

- 1635–1636 – Yerevan Kiosk (Revan Köşkü), designed by Architect Kasemi, in the Topkapı Palace, Istanbul, is built.
- 1636
  - Completion of the Sherdar Madrasa in Samarkand (begun 1619).
  - Construction of Pont Fawr bridge at Llanrwst in Wales.
  - Construction of the Floriana Lines around Floriana on Malta, designed by Pietro Paolo Floriani, is begun.
- 1637 – Almshouses at Moretonhampstead, England, built in surviving form.
- 1638
  - May 13 – Construction begins on the Red Fort in Delhi for Mughal Emperor Shah Jahan.
  - November 7 – The Mariensäule Marian column in Marienplatz in Munich, the first one north of the Alps, is completed.
  - The Queen's House at Greenwich in England, designed by Inigo Jones in 1616 as the first major example of classical architecture in the country, is completed.
- 1638–1639 – Baghdad Kiosk (Bağdat Köşkü), designed by Architect Kasemi, in the Topkapı Palace, Istanbul, is built.

== Births ==
- 1630
  - April 16 – Lambert van Haven, Danish architect (died 1695)
  - September 13 – Olaus Rudbeck, Swedish architect (died 1702)
- 1632
  - July 3 – Tylman van Gameren, Dutch architect (died 1706)
  - October 20 – Christopher Wren, English scientist and architect (died 1723)
  - Lady Elizabeth Wilbraham, née Mytton, English amateur architect (died 1705)
- 1633 – Robert Mylne Scottish stonemason and architect (died 1710)
- 1634 – Francesco Ferrari, Italian Baroque painter and architect (died 1708)
- 1635: July 18 – Robert Hooke, English scientist and architect (died 1703)
- 1638: September 20 – Antonio Gherardi, Italian Baroque painter, sculptor and architect (died 1702)
- 1639 – Lorenzo Gafà, Maltese Baroque architect and sculptor (died 1703)

== Deaths ==
- 1632: October 23 – Giovanni Battista Crespi, Italian painter, sculpture and architect (born 1573)
- 1635
  - Giovanni Battista Crescenzi, Italian-born Baroque painter and architect (born 1577)
  - Giulio Parigi, Italian architect and designer (born 1571)
- 1636 – Giovanni Attard, Maltese architect, military engineer and stone carver (born c. 1570)
- 1637 – Arent Passer, Dutch-born stonemason and architect working in Finland under Swedish rule (born c. 1560)
- 1638: May 27 – Pietro Paolo Floriani, Italian architect and engineer (born 1585)
- 1639: August 6 – Hans van Steenwinckel the Younger, Flemish/Danish architect (born 1587)
