= 1702 in architecture =

The year 1702 in architecture involved some significant events.

== Buildings and structures ==
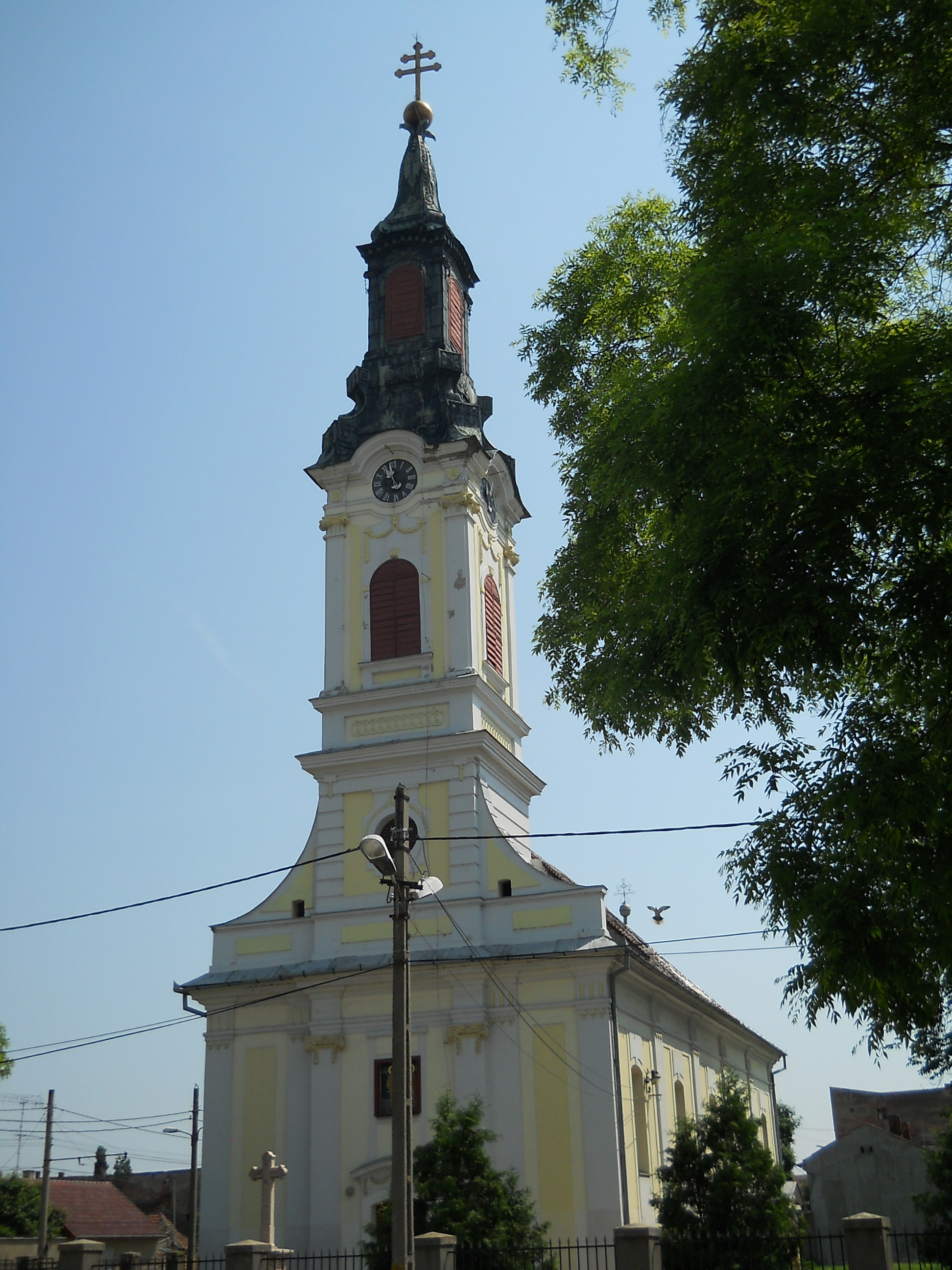
Serbian Church in Arad

=== Buildings ===
- In London, Buckingham Palace is built as the London home of the Duke of Buckingham.
- In Addiscombe, near London, Addiscombe Place is built to the design of architect Sir John Vanbrugh (known for Blenheim Palace).
- In Bhaktapur, Nepal, the Nayatpola Temple, a five-story pagoda, is built at about this date by King Bhupatindra Malla.
- In Copenhagen, Gyldenløve's Mansion is erected by master builder Ernst Brandenburger.
- In Pennsylvania (colony), the Thompson-Neely House is built.
- In Romania, the Serbian Church in Arad is completed.
- In Italy the church of Sant'Antonio, Faenza is rebuilt to the design of Carlo Cesare Scaletta.
- In Rome, the façade of the church of Santa Maria in Trastevere is reconstructed by Carlo Fontana.
- In Germany, the tower of St. Thomas Church, Leipzig, is reconstructed.
- In South Korea, the Gakhwangjeon Hall is completed to a design by a team of Buddhist monks led by Neungo.

== Births ==
- February 3 – Giovanni Battista Vaccarini, Sicilian architect (died 1768)
- February 10 – Carlo Marchionni, Roman architect (died 1786)

== Deaths ==
- May 10 – Antonio Gherardi, Italian painter, sculptor and architect working in Rome (born 1638)
