= Marco Marchetti =

Italian painter

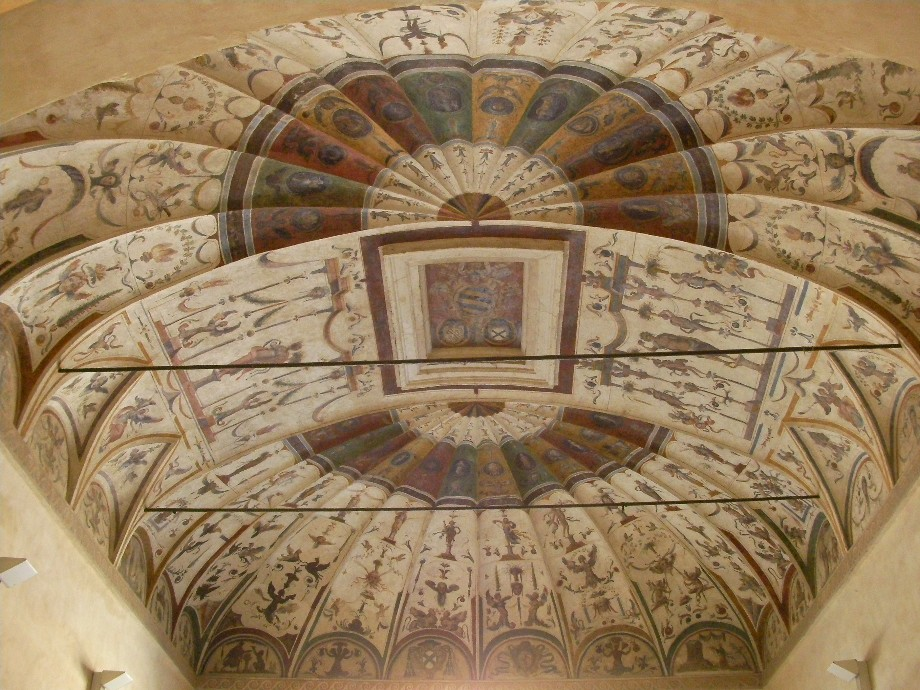

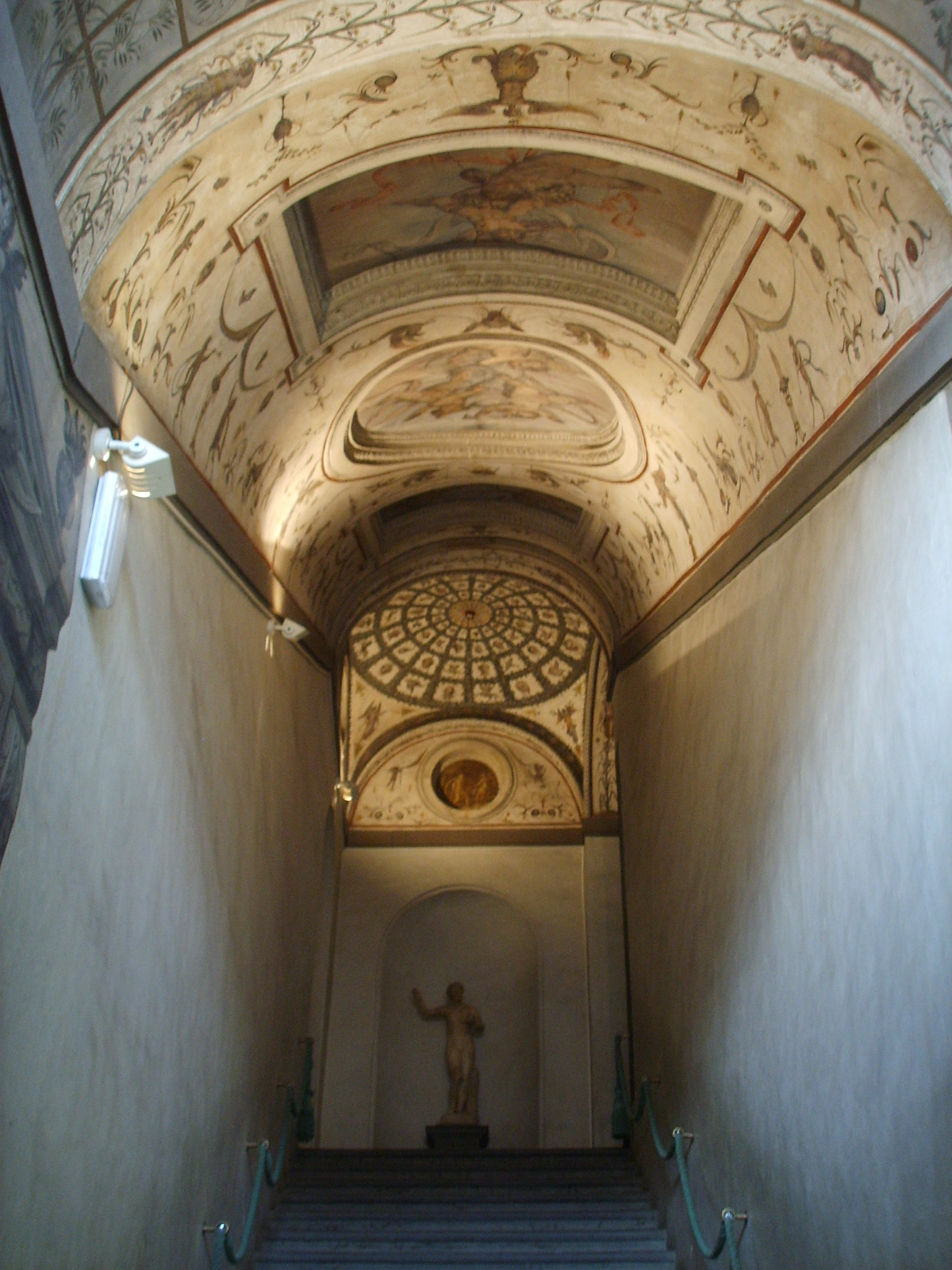
Palazzio Vecchio stairway in Florence

Marco Marchetti (c. 1528 – 1588) was an Italian painter of the late-Renaissance or Mannerist period. Born in Faenza, he is also known as Marco da Faenza. He painted an Adoration by the shepherds (1567) originally in the church of the confraternity of Santa Maria dell'Angelo, but now in the pinacoteca of Faenza. He also painted along with Giorgio Vasari a series of frescoes in the Palazzo Vecchio representing the Life of Hercules. He painted an altarpiece representing the Martyrdom of St. Catherine of Alexandria (1580) in the church of Sant'Antonio in Faenza.

Corrado Ricci describes him as an artist in Ravenna whose little narrative scenes, crowded with figures, and whose lively "grotesques" were appreciated and sought after both in Rome and Florence.
