= Francesco Peparelli =

Italian architect

Francesco Peparelli (died 6 November 1641, Rome) was an Italian architect during the 17th century. According to a contemporary historian, Giovanni Baglione, between palaces, castles, churches and convents, Peparelli participated in about seventy construction projects but only about thirty can be attributed to him with certainty.

== Life ==
In 1601 he was apprenticed to the architect Ottaviano Nonni and with him, contributed to the design of Santa Maria in Traspontina. He was skilled in engineering, cartography and hydraulics; and he was often commissioned with the construction of buildings designed by other architects.

Peparelli often worked in various capacities with Girolamo Rainaldi, such as the Chiesa di S. Teresa in Caprarola. He also collaborated with Carlo Maderno in remodelling of existing structures, such as Santa Maria Maddalena.

In 1620 he oversaw the renovation of the Palazzetto Mattei in the Villa Celimontana. Around 1630 Pope Urban VIII decided to rebuild the church of San Caio from the ground up and retained Peparelli and Vincenzo della Greca as architects; the works lasted from 1630 to 1631. In 1632 Cardinal Francesco Barberini, protector of the Archconfraternita della Carità, commissioned Peparelli to renovate the hospice associated with San Girolamo della Carità. In 1634 he undertook the reconstruction and enlargement of the church of S. Maria delle Vergini, where his sister, Anna Maria, was an Augustinian nun.

Peparelli had an extensive library with a range of sixteenth and seventeenth-century architectural treatises. Peparelli designed the Palazzo Valentini. Peparelli taught and later collaborated with Giovan Antonio de' Rossi. In 1634 he became a member of the Accademia di San Luca.

== Works ==
- Palazzo Cerri (1627)
- Palazzo Del Ferraioli (1627)
- Palazzo Cardelli (1630)
- Hospice of San Girolamo della Carità (1632)
- Convent and monastery of Santa Maria in Campo Marzio (1635)
- Palazzo Del Bufalo Cancellieri
- Palazzo del Monte di Pietà (expansion, with Carlo Maderno and Francesco Borromini)
- Palazzo Valentini
- Palazzo Santacroce, and its Nymphaeum of the birth of Venus, Regola (1630–40)
- Santa Brigida a Campo de' Fiori
- Santa Maria delle Vergini, later S. Rita da Cascia
- Santa Maria in Traspontina
- San Salvatore in Campo (1639–40) - commissioned by cardinal Francesco Barberini
