= 1768 in architecture =

The year 1768 in architecture involved some significant events.

== Events ==
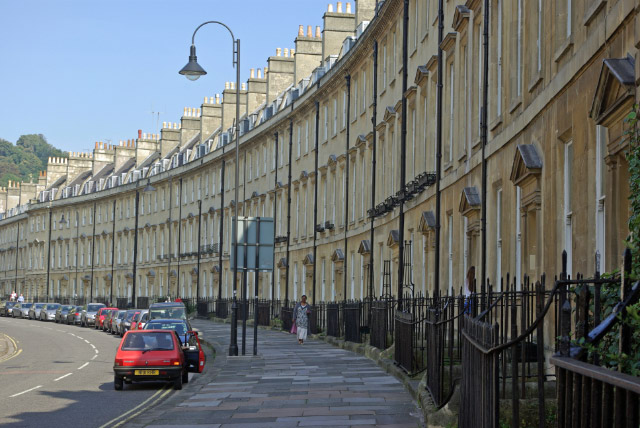
The Paragon, Bath

- Work begins on Monticello near Charlottesville, Virginia, designed by Thomas Jefferson.
- Duchal House, Scotland, extended.
- In Bath, England, St James' Church is designed by John Palmer of Bath (between 1768-1769).
- Potseluev Bridge, St Petersburg, Russia, reconstructed to accommodate horse traffic.
- Architects Domenico Merlini and Szymon Bogumił Zug are ennobled in Poland.

== Buildings and structures ==
=== Buildings completed ===
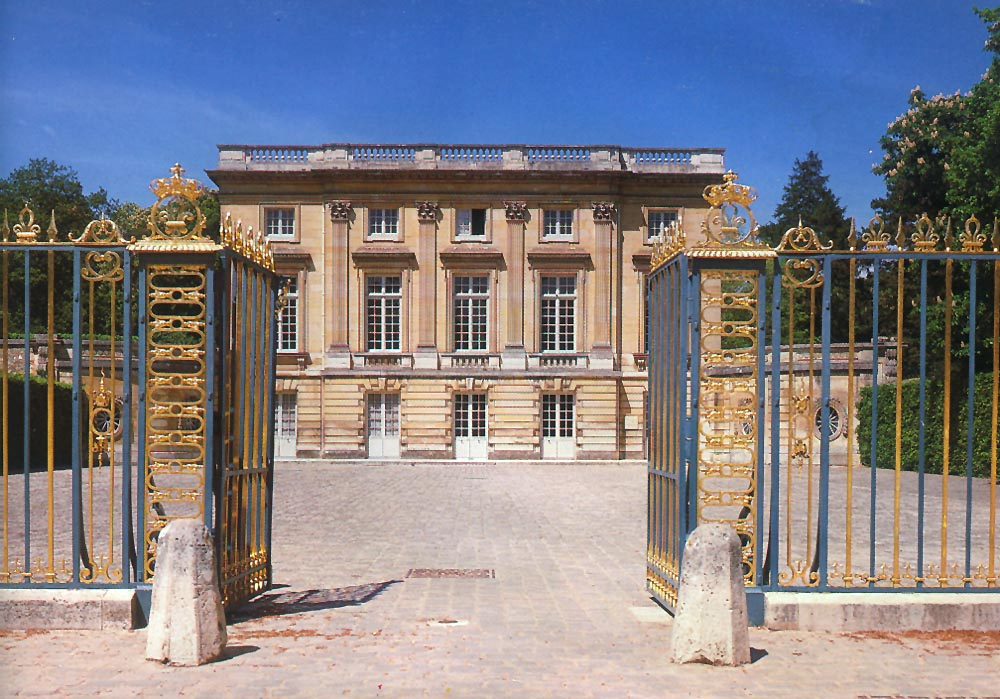
Petit Trianon

- Nathaniel Hill Brick House, Montgomery, New York.
- The Paragon, Bath, England, designed by Thomas Warr Attwood.
- Petit Trianon, Versailles, France, originally designed by Ange-Jacques Gabriel by the order of King Louis XV for his long-term mistress, Madame de Pompadour, but used by Queen Marie Antoinette.
- Blue Mosque, Yerevan.
- Façade of Theatine Church, Munich, designed by François de Cuvilliés, is completed by his son.
- Reconstruction of Puerta del Sol in Madrid and construction of Real Casa de Correos (post office) there, both begun by Ventura Rodríguez, are completed by Jaime Marquet.

== Births ==
- April 12 – John Sanders, architect, first pupil of Sir John Soane (died 1826)
- May 11 – David Hamilton, Glasgow architect (died 1843)

== Deaths ==
- February 8 – George Dance the Elder, City of London surveyor and architect (born 1695)
- March 11 – Giovanni Battista Vaccarini, Sicilian Baroque architect (born 1702)
- April 14 – François de Cuvilliés, Walloon-born Bavarian architect (born 1695)
