= 1706 in architecture =

The year 1706 in architecture involved some significant events.

== Buildings and structures ==
=== Buildings ===
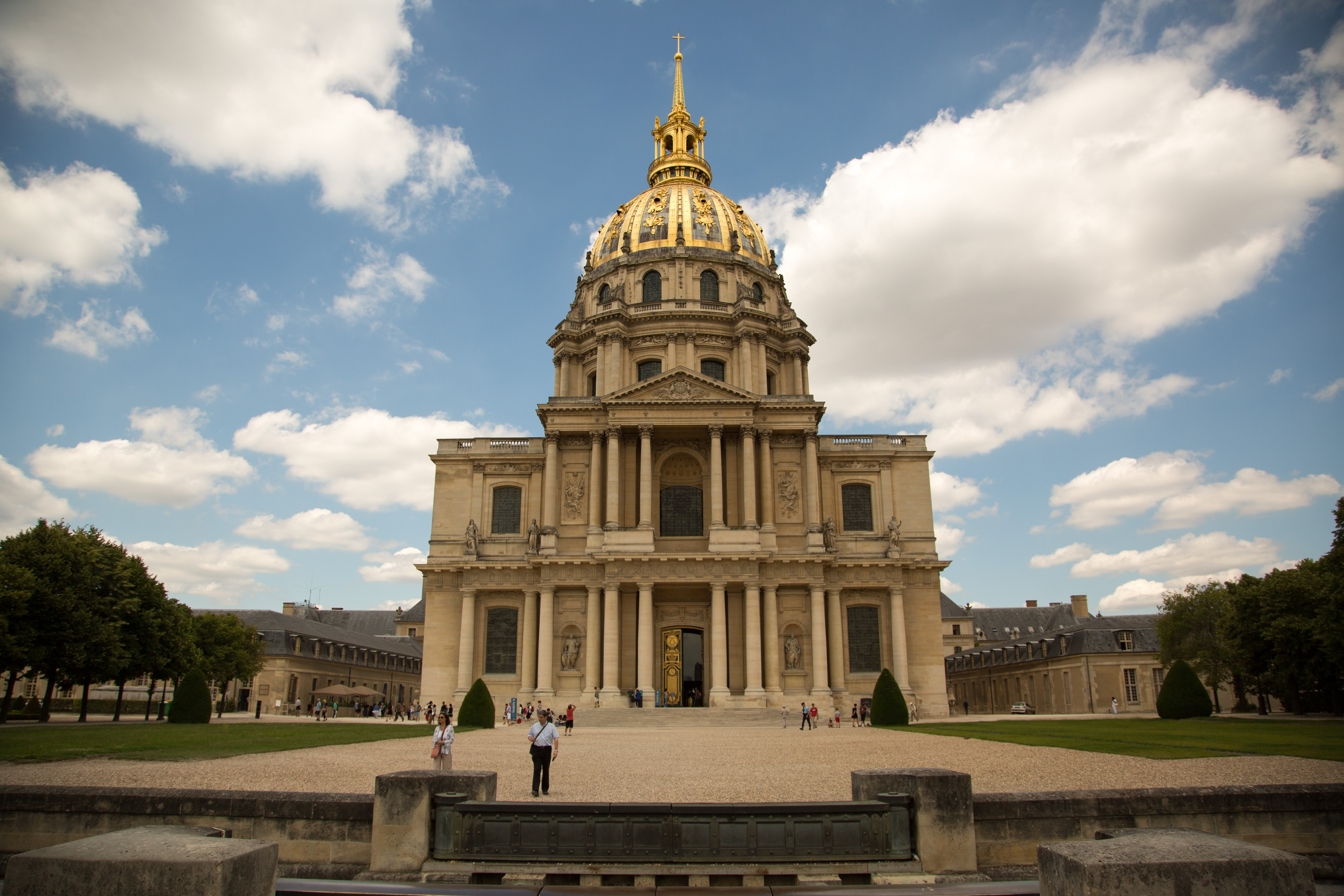
Les Invalides

- August 22 – The royal chapel (Église du Dôme) at Les Invalides is consecrated, following completion of the dome.
- August – Ljubljana Cathedral, largely designed by Andrea Pozzo, is completed and opens for worship (not consecrated until 1707).
- unknown dates
  - Dominican Church and Convent of Assumption of Mary in Tarnobrzeg, Poland, is rebuilt.
  - Church of St George the Martyr, Holborn, London, designed by Arthur Tooley, is completed.
  - Yeni-Kale, Ottoman Turkish fortress in the Crimea, is completed under the guidance of Goloppo.

== Births ==
- March 4 – Lauritz de Thurah, Danish architect (died 1759)
- August 28 – Jan Bouman, Dutch architect working in Potsdam (died 1776)
- unknown dates
  - Mateus Vicente de Oliveira, Portuguese architect (died 1786)
  - Thomas Gilbert, English architect (died 1776)

== Deaths ==
- October? – Martin Grünberg, Prussian architect (born c.1655)
- Approximate date – Tylman van Gameren, Dutch architect working in Warsaw (born 1632)
