= Queen Anne House, Portland =

Building in Portland, Dorset, England

Coordinates: 50.5586°N 2.4401°W

Queen Anne House is an 18th-century detached house located within the village of Fortuneswell, on the Isle of Portland, Dorset, England. The house, together with its boundary wall and gate piers, has been a Grade II* listed building since May 1993.

== History ==
The house, dating back to the 18th-century, is an example of English domestic architecture. It is believed to have been built by architect and quarry merchant Thomas Gilbert. Some unverified sources suggest a circa 1720 construction date, more likely is a post 1728 date due to the use of a Gibbs pattern door surround. Having been constructed for Gilbert to use as his own residence, the house quickly became noted for being the finest and most complete house of its period on the island.

Gilbert himself was the architect of a number of houses in the Portland area, but most notably for St George's Church, which was built between 1754 and 1766, within the hamlet of Reforne. The church has since been regarded as one of the most impressive 18th-century churches in Dorset, and remains a Grade I listed building. Today the house has been renovated and opened as a luxury bed and breakfast, awarded 4 Stars by AA.
