= San Salvatore in Campo =

Church building in Rome, Italy

Coordinates: 41.893705°N 12.474022°E

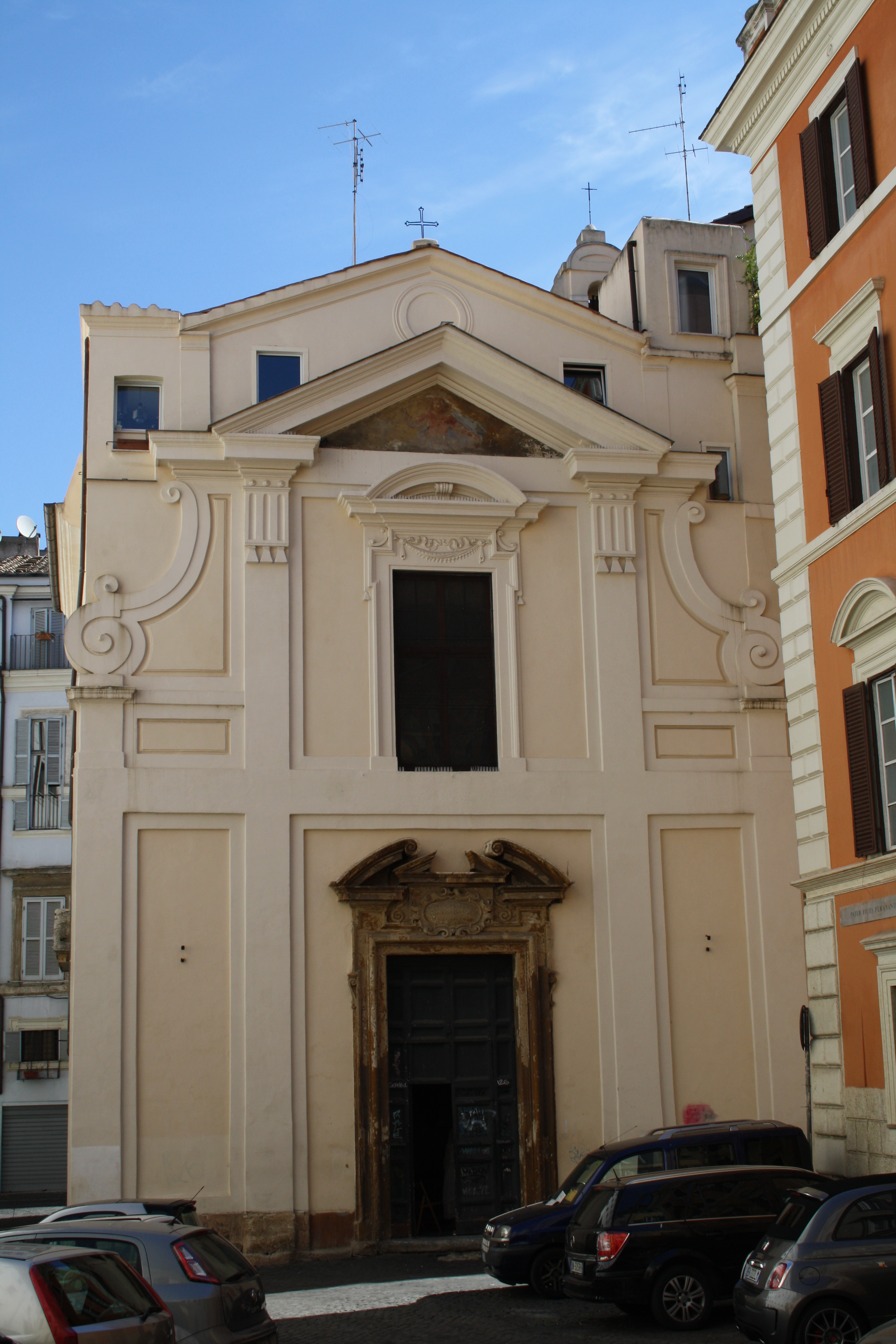
Facade of church in 2013

San Salvatore in Campo is a Roman Catholic church located on the small piazza of the same name, not far from the church of Santissima Trinità dei Pellegrini, in the Rione (district) of Regola of central Rome, Italy.

== History ==
A parish church of this name had existed since the first half of the 10th century, in the region now occupied by Palazzo Monte di Pietà. It is not clear why the church has the suffix in Campo, one hypothesis was said to derive from the patronage of an Abbot Campo, who was then leading the powerful Benedictine Farfa Abbey. Alternatively, it may be that the church stood before a campi, a name used for large plazas. In the 16th century, the church was attached to the Confraternity of the Trinità dei Pellegrini, founded by the Oratory of Saint Philip Neri. In the 17th century, this ancient church was razed.

In 1639, Pope Urban VIII built a new parish church, with the same title. The architect was Francesco Peparelli. The church now is sponsored by the Eritrean Orthodox Tewahedo Church.

Alessandro Cagliostro married Lorenza Feliciani here on April 8, 1751.
