= Ottaviano Nonni =

Italian architect, sculptor and painter

Il Mascherino
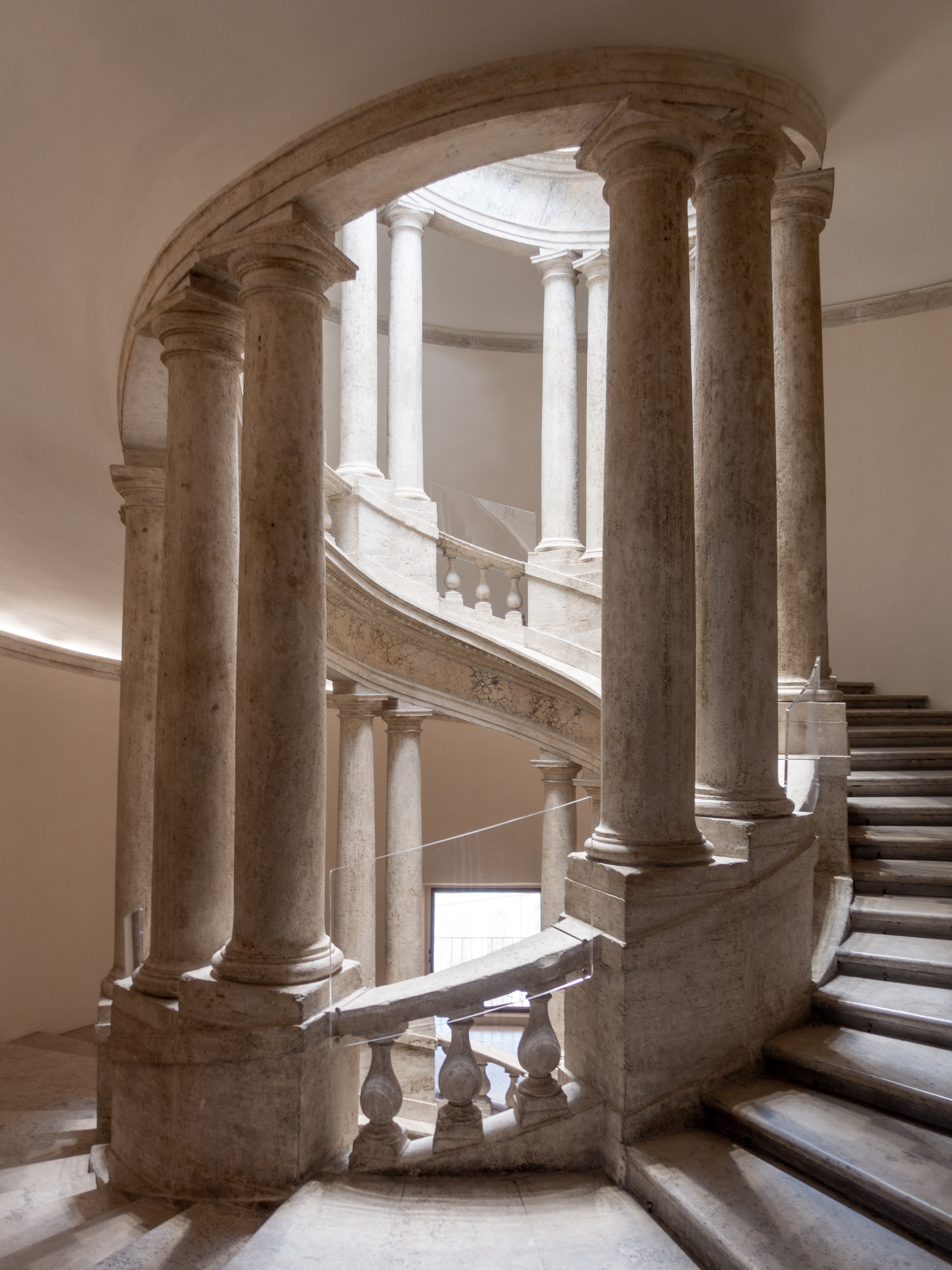
- The Mascarino Staircase in the Quirinal Palace
- Born: Ottaviano Nonni; 1536; Bologna, Papal States
- Died: 6 August 1606 (aged 69–70); Rome, Papal States
- Education: Giacomo Barozzi da Vignola
- Known for: Sculpture, painting, architecture
- Movement: Mannerism
- Patron(s): Pope Gregory XIII

Ottaviano Nonni (1536 – 6 August 1606), called Il Mascherino, was an Italian architect, sculptor, and painter born in Bologna. He was the architect of the Quirinal Palace under Pope Gregory XIII. His other works include the churches of San Salvatore in Lauro (1591), Santa Maria in Traspontina, the Bandini Chapel in San Silvestro al Quirinale, and the oval plan-design for the church of Santo Spirito in Sassia.

== Biography ==
=== Early life and education ===
Ottaviano Nonni was born in Bologna in 1536. Apprentice of Giacomo Barozzi da Vignola, he was active in Emilia and in Rome, where he had been living in the rione of Borgo, in the road still bearing his name (Via del Mascherino). Vignola’s influence is clear in Mascherino’s earliest attributed work, the Porta Pia (Porta di Sant'Isaia) in Bologna (1567–71), and it has been suggested that he merely executed Vignola’s design.

=== In Bologna ===
Mascherino is documented in 1568 as the architect supervising the construction of the Fountain of Neptune, Bologna. A year later he joined the Consiglio dei Bombasari e Pittori in Bologna, and his first documented works are paintings. Also in 1569, with Lorenzo Fiorini, in the Cubiculum Artistarum of the University of Bologna he painted frescoes representing the Liberal Arts and executed the niche and statue of Apollo for the entrance. There are echoes of Parmigianino, Lorenzo Sabatini and Giambologna in these works. In the Villa Guastavillani at Barbiano (near Bologna), there are frescoes and a statue of Bacchus attributed to him. He probably also planned this villa, which was begun in 1575 by Cardinal Filippo Guastavillani, a nephew of Pope Gregory XIII.

=== In Rome ===
Mascherino is documented in Rome in 1574, where he was instrumental in introducing the style of the Bolognese school. He was first employed as a painter at the Vatican, working on the loggias of Gregory XIII; he also painted quadrature in the Sala del Bologna. As a painter, he was elected to the Accademia di San Luca in 1576 and to the Virtuosi al Pantheon in 1580. From 1574 he is also mentioned as an architect; he probably assisted the papal architect Martino Longhi the Elder, whom he succeeded in 1577. At the Vatican he modified the east side of the Cortile di San Damaso and began what became the palace of Pope Sixtus V. Other projects there included the construction of the Vatican Gallery of Maps above the west corridor of the Cortile del Belvedere (from 1578), the Torre dei Venti (1578–80), the west loggia in the upper court of the Belvedere (1582–5) and the restructuring of Santa Marta (1582).

From 1582 to 1585 he planned the restructuring of a summer palace, the Vigna d’Este, on the Quirinal Hill in Rome, for Gregory XIII, including a casino with a two-storey loggia and side wings, surmounted by a central tower (now part of the Quirinal Palace). His oval staircase in the casino was one of the first to be constructed. A predilection for the oval form, and for centrally planned structures in general, is evident in many of his unrealized designs. Mascherino held the post of papal architect until the death of Gregory XIII (in 1585) and again under Innocent IX. This gave him access to a large clientele.

Ecclesiastical works in Rome for other important patrons included the Bandini Chapel in San Silvestro al Quirinale (1580–85), the restructuring of Santa Caterina della Ruota (1585–before 1591), the church and cloister of Santi Giovanni Evangelista e Petronio (from 1582), the supervision of the construction of Santa Maria in Traspontina, designed (1581–7) by Giovanni Sallustio Peruzzi, and the oval steps leading to the cloister of the Ospedale di Santo Spirito in Sassia.

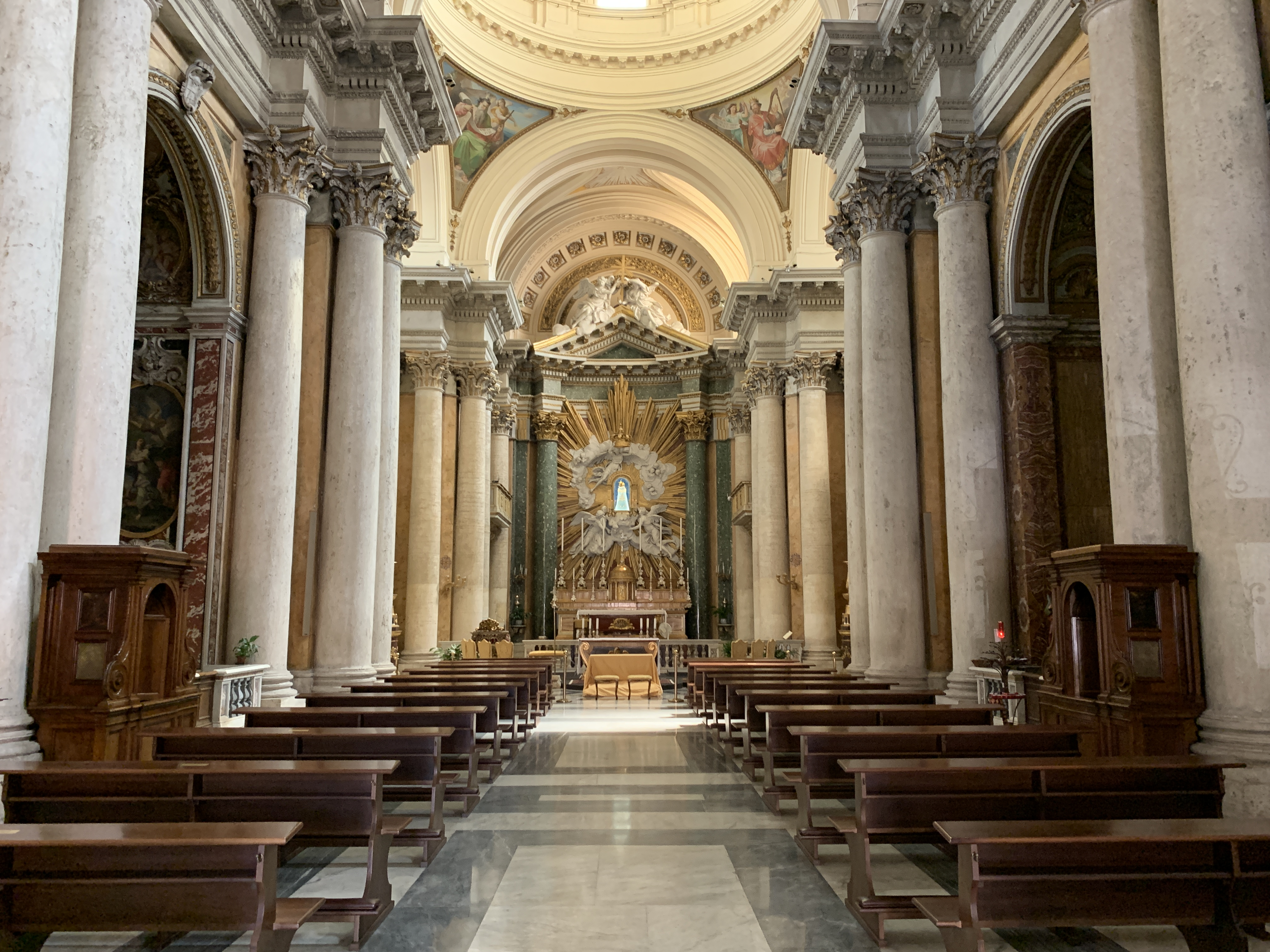
Interior of the church of San Salvatore in Lauro (after 1591)

In the nave of San Salvatore in Lauro (after 1591) the use of free-standing, paired columns has contributed much to Mascherino’s fame, although the attribution is not unanimous. He also worked on the reconstruction of Roman palaces, including the Albero, Alessandrino, Ginnasi, Aldobrandini, Verospi and the Monte di Pietà. The dates and the extent of his participation in these projects are uncertain, however.

Although many aspects of Mascherino’s work remain to be clarified, according to Wasserman, he is particularly interesting for his way of organizing interior spaces, for example the use of different designs for the sides of a courtyard, and for the juxtaposition of urban and suburban architectural elements. He was certainly appreciated by his contemporaries, as is clear from his nomination in 1604 as principe of the Accademia di San Luca. He died in Rome in 1606.

== Bibliography ==
- Baglione, Giovanni (1733) [1641]. Le Vite de' Pittori, Scultori, Architetti, ed Intagliatori dal Pontificato di Gregorio XII del 1572. fino a' tempi de Papa Urbano VIII. nel 1642 [Lives of the painters, sculptors, architects, and engravers during the papacies of Gregory XII in 1572 to Urban VIII in 1642]. Naples: Giovanni Battista Passari. p. 93.
- Milizia, Francesco (1797). Dizionario delle Belle Arti del Disegno. Vol. 2 (2nd ed.). Bassano, Italy. p. 61.
- Wasserman, J. (1962). "The Palazzo Sisto V in the Vatican". Journal of the Society of Architectural Historians. 21: 26–35.
- Wasserman, J. (1963). "The Quirinal Palace in Rome". Art Bulletin. 45: 205–44.
- Wasserman, J. (1966). Ottaviano Mascarino and his Drawings in the Accademia Nazionale di San Luca. Rome: Accademia nazionale di San Luca.
- Heydenreich, L. H.; Lotz, W. (1974). Architecture in Italy, 1400–1600. Pelican History of Art. Harmondsworth: Penguin Books.
- Negro, E. (1988). "Cubiculum Artistarum et Cubiculum Juristarum: La decorazione pittorica cinquecentesca delle aule". In G. Roversi (ed.). L’archiginnasio, il palazzo, l’università, la biblioteca. Vol. 1. Bologna. pp. 145–58.
- Negro, E. (1990). "Ottaviano Mascherino pittore e scultore". In J. Bentini (ed.). Lelio Orsi e la cultura del suo tempo. Bologna. pp. 161–72.
