= St George's Church, Portland =

Church in Dorset, England

St George's Church,
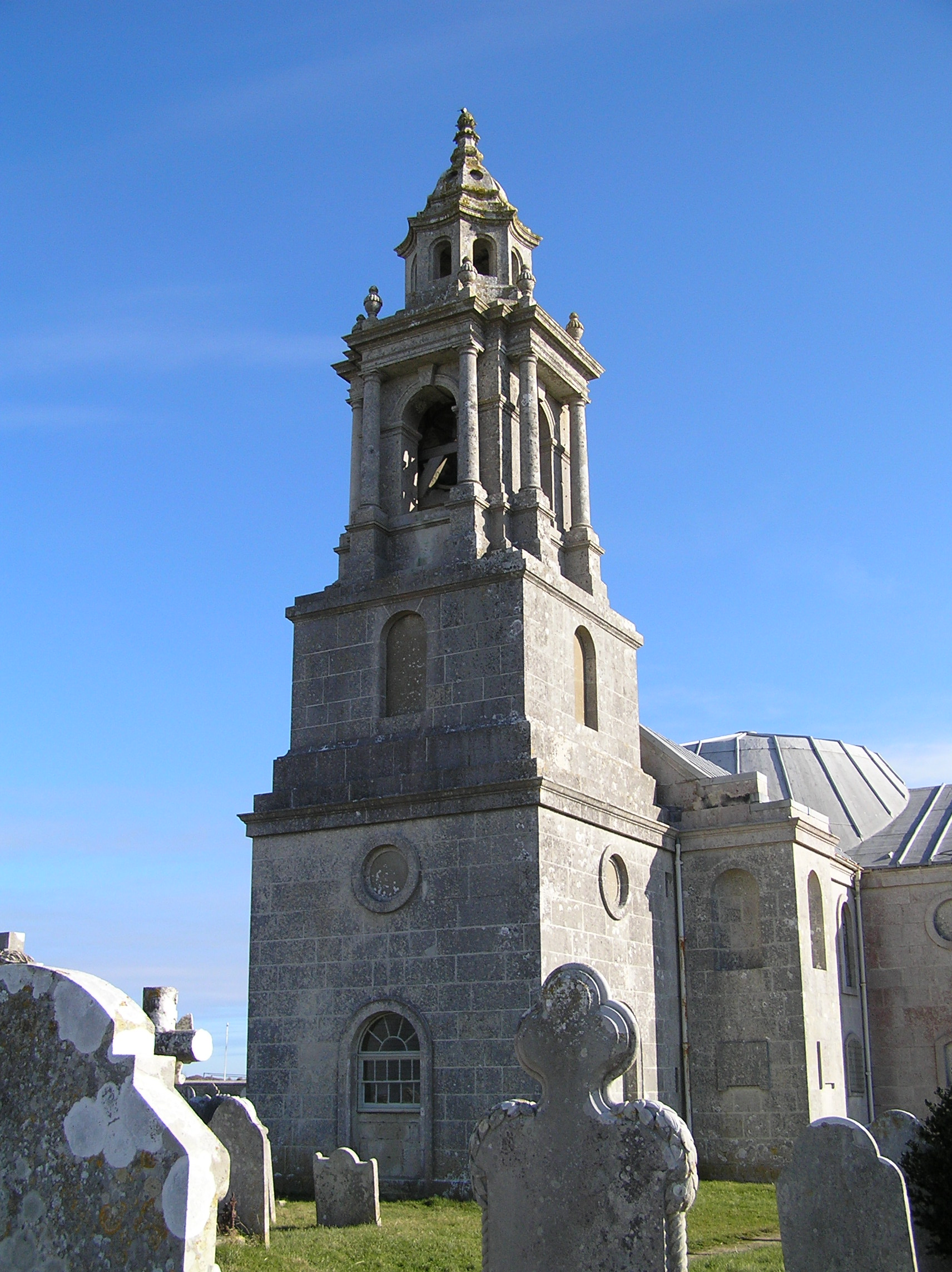
- St George's Church, Portland, view of the tower from the west

Religion
- Affiliation: Church of England
- Leadership: Churches Conservation Trust
- Year consecrated: 1766

Location
- Location: Isle of Portland, Dorset, England
- Interactive map of St George's Church,
- Coordinates: 50.5470°N 2.4438°W

Architecture
- Architect: Thomas Gilbert
- Type: Church
- Style: Georgian
- Completed: 1766
- Materials: Portland stone with slate roof

St George's Church is a Church of England church on the Isle of Portland, built between 1754 and 1766 to replace St. Andrew's which had fallen into disuse and was no longer suitable as a place of worship.

During the 1960s a restoration of the church took place under the stewardship of a group formed to protect the church. It then came under the care of the Churches Conservation Trust, which continues to the present. No longer retained for regular worship, services are nevertheless held twice annually, on St George's Day and Christmas Day.

== History ==
The history of St. George's Church began in August 1753. A committee of Portlanders was formed to decide whether to put further finances into the dilapidated St. Andrew's Church or to erect a new church at a more accessible position. St. Andrew's suffered from an unstable site and was prone to landslips (notably those on the east side of Portland in 1665 and 1734). Within two months a decision was made, with a survey of the old church finding that repairs would be at least half the cost of a new building. A year after the completion of the church, a house was built nearby for the parish clerk, and this building would become The George Inn.

The church was closed in 1914 for many reasons, and fell into further disrepair ever since that time. In the 1960s however, the church fell under the protection of a newly formed group, the 'Friends of St George's Church', who were able to restore the church. Now no longer needed for regular worship, the church is now a redundant church in the care of the Churches Conservation Trust. It was declared redundant on 16 April 1970, and was vested in the Trust on 27 October 1971.

== Architecture ==
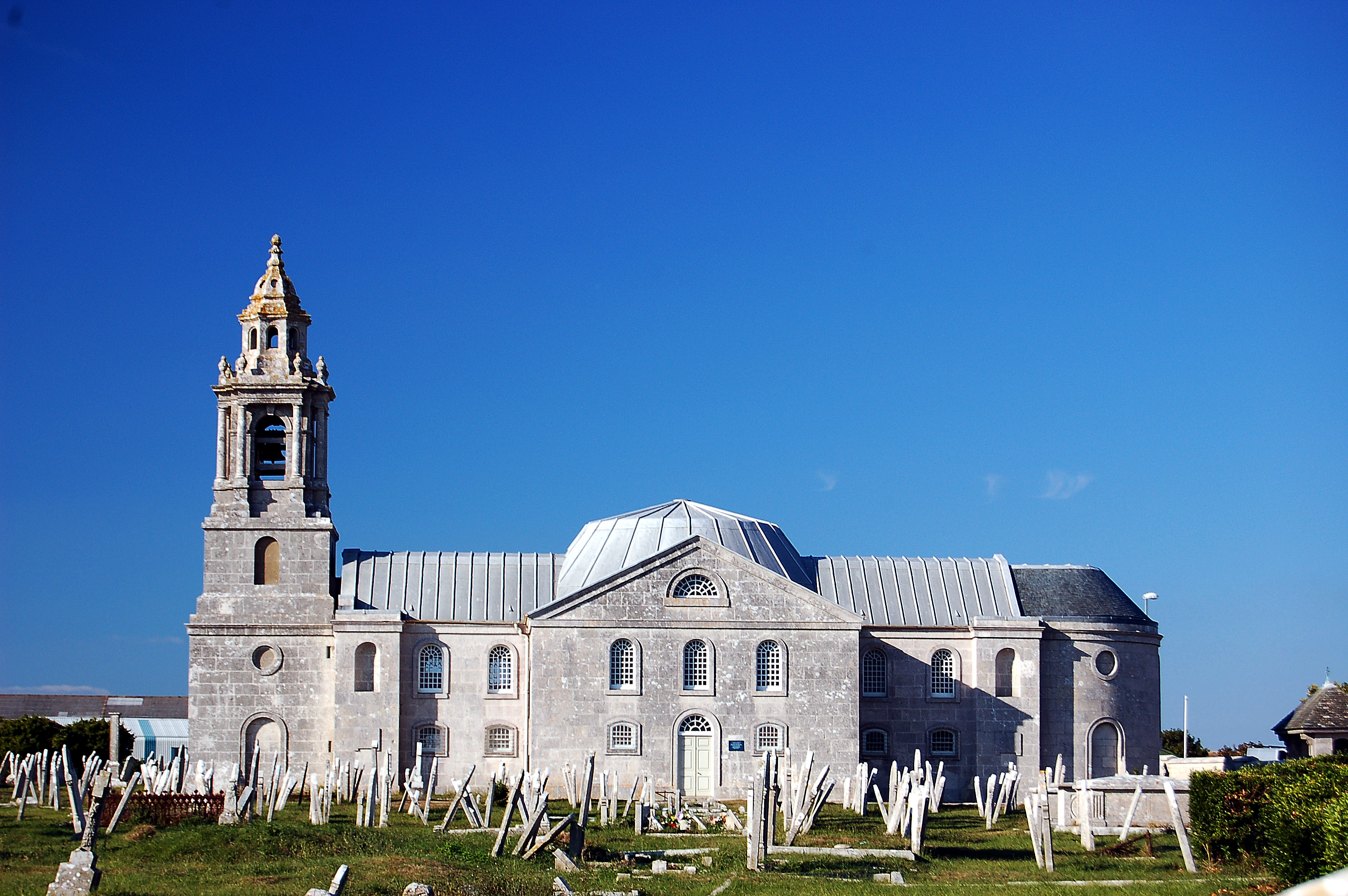
View of St George's Church from the south

Designed by architect and quarry merchant Thomas Gilbert, St George's is regarded as one of the most impressive 18th-century churches in Dorset. It is a large church built of Portland stone and has a tower, a nave, transepts, an apse, and a kind of 'abortive dome' over the crossing. The design is reminiscent of the works of Christopher Wren (particularly the tower, in relation to those of St Paul's Cathedral). The windows are arranged in two tiers, all with simple, broad raised frames that lack moulding. It is designated as a Grade I listed building. Gilbert is also believed to be the architect of a number of houses within the local area, including the Grade II* Listed Queen Anne House, his own residence built in the 18th century.

== See also ==
- Grade I listed buildings in Dorset
- List of churches preserved by the Churches Conservation Trust in South West England
