= Michelangelo Ricciolini =

Italian painter (1654–1715)

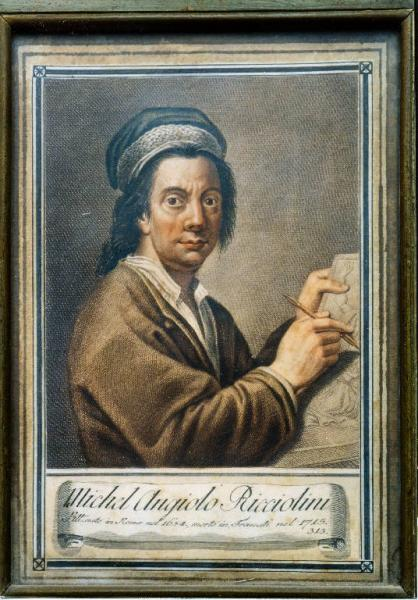
Self-portrait of painter Michelangelo Ricciolini

Michelangelo Ricciolini (29 September 1654 – 10 December 1715) was an Italian painter of the Baroque period.

He first studied at Rome under Angelo Canini, then joined the large studio of Carlo Maratta. He painted various works in Rome, including the dome of Santa Rita da Cascia alle Vergini.
