= Santa Rita da Cascia alle Vergini =

- Church of Rita of Cascia on the Way of the Virgins
- Chiesa di Santa Rita da Cascia alle Vergini
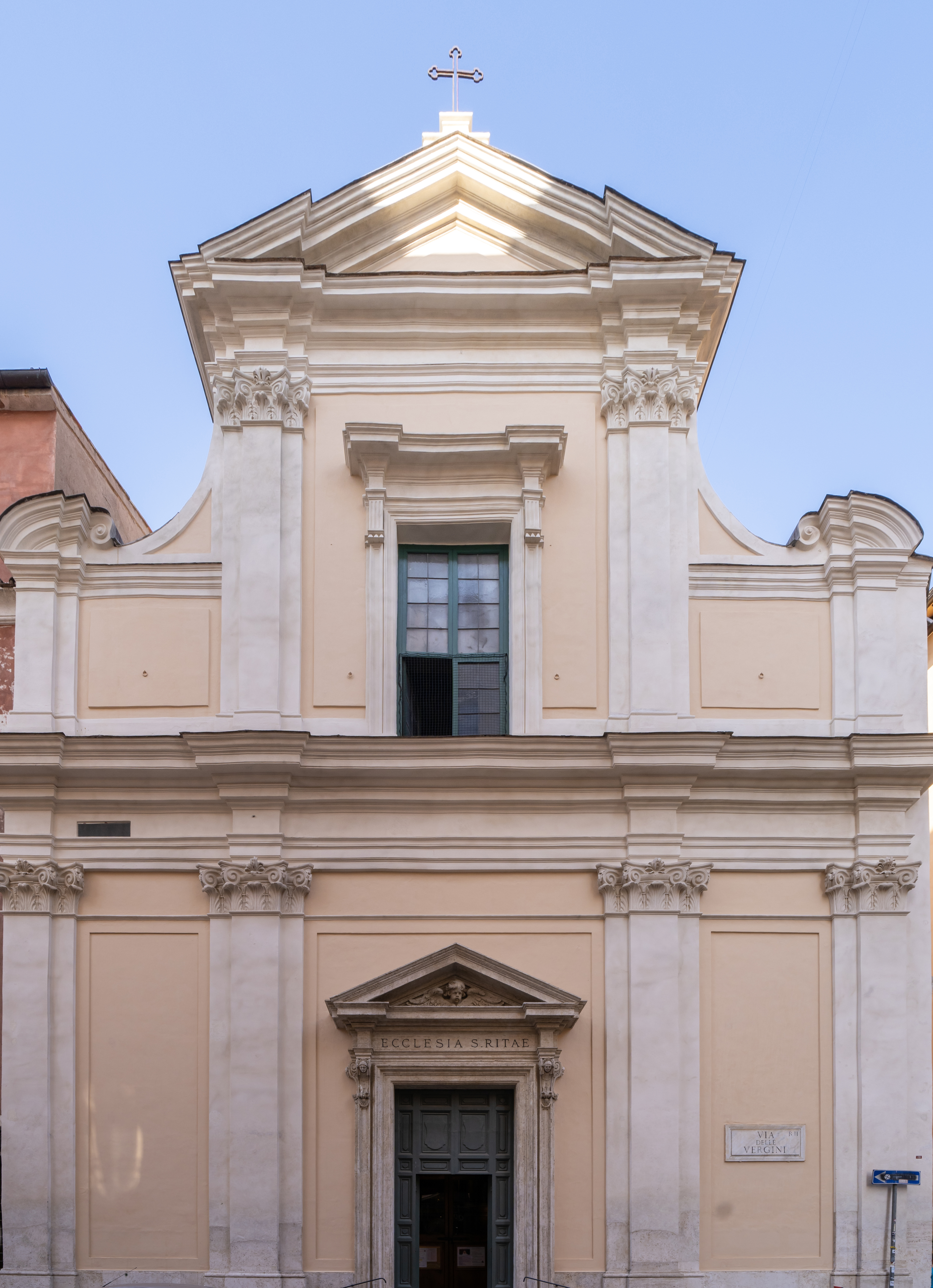
- Click on the map for a fullscreen view
- 41°53′59″N 12°28′58″E
- Location: Via dell'Umiltà 83b, Trevi, Rome
- Country: Italy
- Language: Italian
- Denomination: Catholic
- Tradition: Roman Rite
- Religious order: Confraternita della Santa Spina della Corona di Nostro Signore Gesù Cristo e di santa Rita da Cascia
- Website: santaritaallevergini.it

History
- Status: regional church
- Dedication: Rita of Cascia

Architecture
- Functional status: active
- Architect: Francesco Peparelli
- Architectural type: Baroque
- Groundbreaking: 1634

Administration
- Diocese: Rome

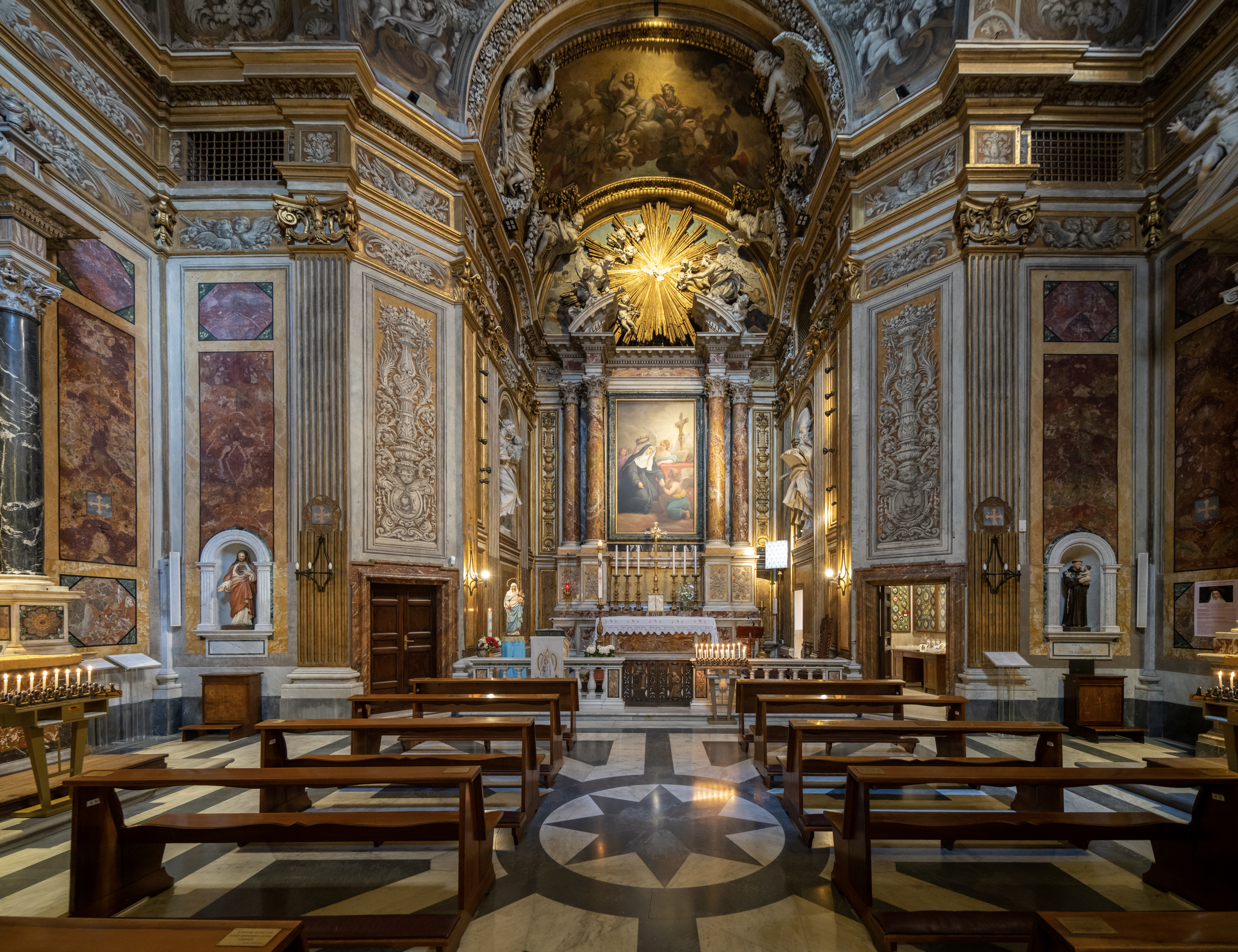
Interior

Santa Rita da Cascia alle Vergini is a Roman Catholic church in Rome, sited at the corner of Via delle Vergini and Via dell’Umiltà. Diagonal from the church on Via delle Vergini is the Teatro Quirino.

== History ==
The church has a complex history. It was first built in 1615 with the dedication 'Santa Maria delle Vergini', on the site of a pre-existing church of the same name and assigned to the care of Augustinian monks of the neighboring 'Collegio della Madonna del Rifugio'. It was too small for the college and so was almost immediately expanded and rebuilt between 1634 and 1636. In 1660 the complex was finally completed, under the direction of Domenico Castelli. Its facade dates to 1681 and is attributed to Mattia de Rossi - a bell-tower was added in 1689. The church and the monastery remained with the Augustinian order until 1870, when they were confiscated by the state, which closed the monastery and deconsecrated the church.

In 1904 the Chiesa di Santa Rita da Cascia in Campitelli was deconstructed to make way for the Vittorio Emanuele II Monument. This meant the Confraternity of the Holy Crown of thorns of Our Lord Saviour Jesus Christ and of Saint Rita of Cascia (Confraternita della Santa Spina della Corona di Nostro Signore Gesù Cristo e di santa Rita da Cascia) had to move to the former church of Santa Maria delle Vergini, which it reopened, reconsecrated and rededicated to Saint Rita of Cascia. It is the national (regional) church of Umbria.

== Description ==
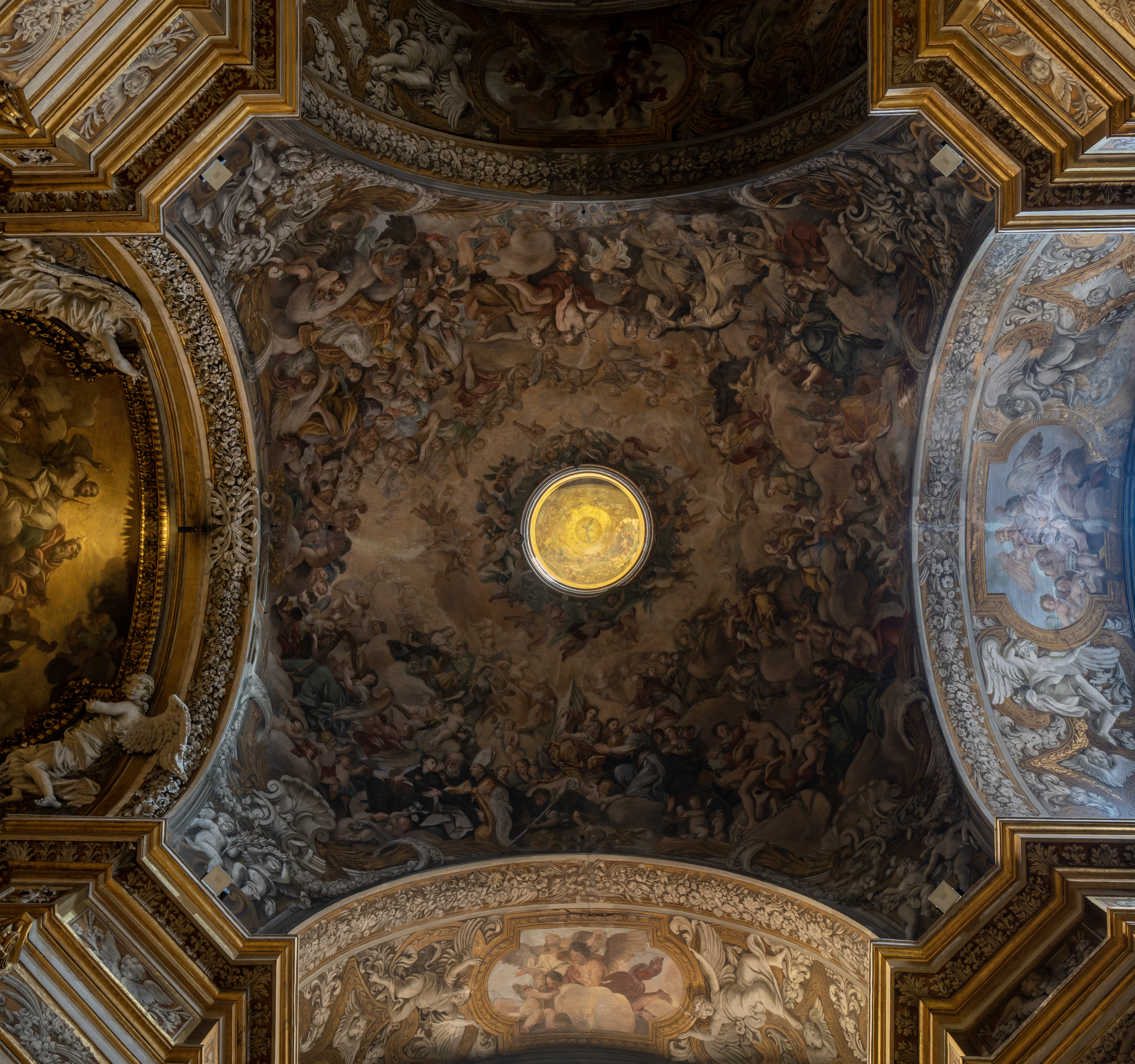
Dome

The interior is on a Greek cross plan, with Baroque decoration. Its dome fresco by Michelangelo Ricciolini depicts the Glory of Paradise. The church houses a gilded wooden organ. To the left of the entrance is a chapel in the form of the grotto at Our Lady of Lourdes, dedicated in 1912.

== Sources ==
- M. Armellini, Le chiese di Roma dal secolo IV al XIX, Roma 1891, pp. 259–260
- C. Hülsen, Le Chiese di Roma nel Medio Evo, Firenze 1927, p. 322
- F. Titi, Descrizione delle Pitture, Sculture e Architetture esposte in Roma, Roma 1763, pp. 326–327
- C. Rendina, Le Chiese di Roma, Newton & Compton Editori, Milano 2000, p. 324
- L. Pratesi, Rione II Trevi, in AA.VV, I rioni di Roma, Newton & Compton Editori, Milano 2000, Vol. I, pp. 131–201
