= 1769 in architecture =

The year 1769 in architecture involved some significant events.

== Buildings and structures ==
=== Buildings ===
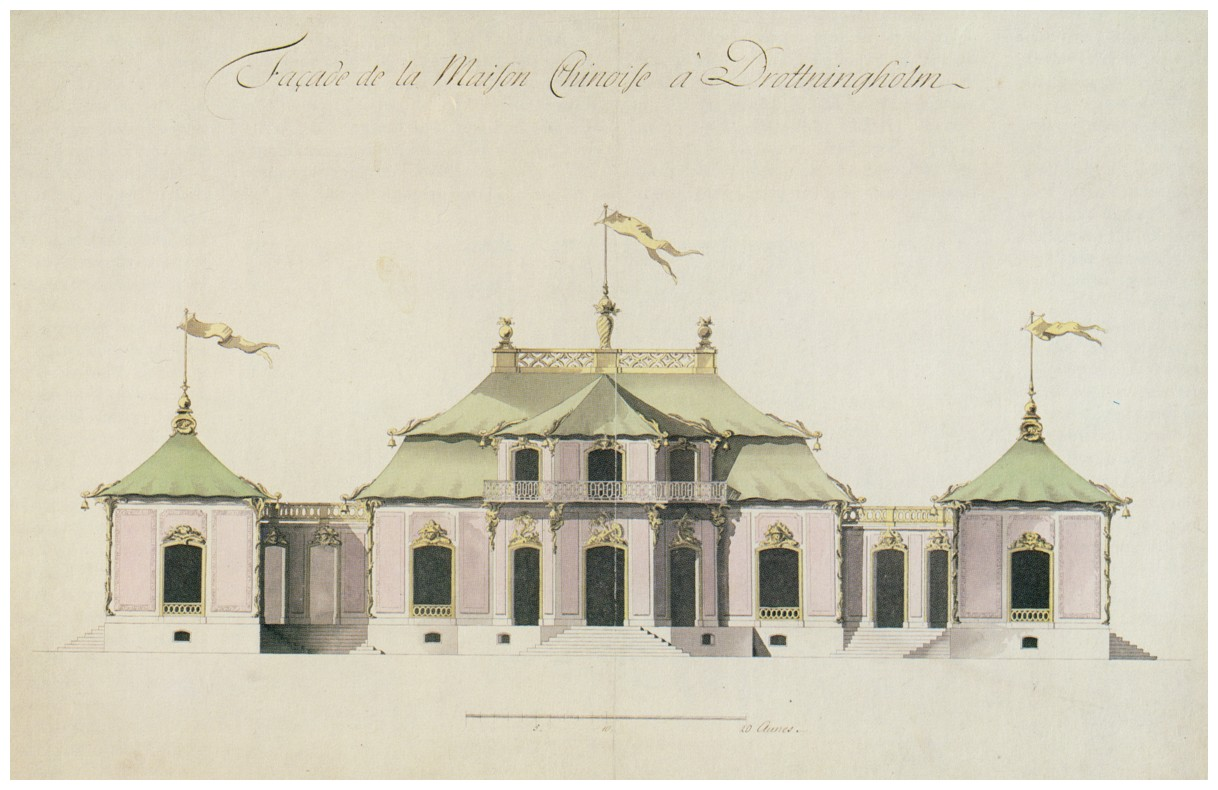
Architects' drawing for Chinese Pavilion at Drottningholm

- Second Chinese Pavilion at Drottningholm in Sweden, designed by Carl Fredrik Adelcrantz, is completed
- Blackfriars Bridge in London, designed by Robert Mylne, opens to the public (demolished in the 1860s)
- St James' Church in Bath, England, designed by John Palmer of Bath, is completed (begun in 1768)
- Church of St Philip and St James at Mittelstrimmig in the Rhineland, perhaps designed by Paul Stehling, is completed
- St Clement's Church, Moscow is completed
- Work on Syon House, Middlesex, England, to the design of Robert Adam, ceases
- Reconstruction of the Collegiate Church of Saint Michael at Vydubychi Monastery in Kiev to the design of M. I. Yurasov is completed
- Teatro Bibiena (Teatro Scientifico dell'Accademia di Mantova) in Mantua, Lombardy, designed by Antonio Galli Bibiena, is opened

== Births ==
- August 4 – Vasily Stasov, Russian architect (died 1848)

== Deaths ==
- February 25 – Henry Flitcroft, English Palladian architect (born 1697)
