= Santa Maria in Traspontina =

Catholic church in Rome

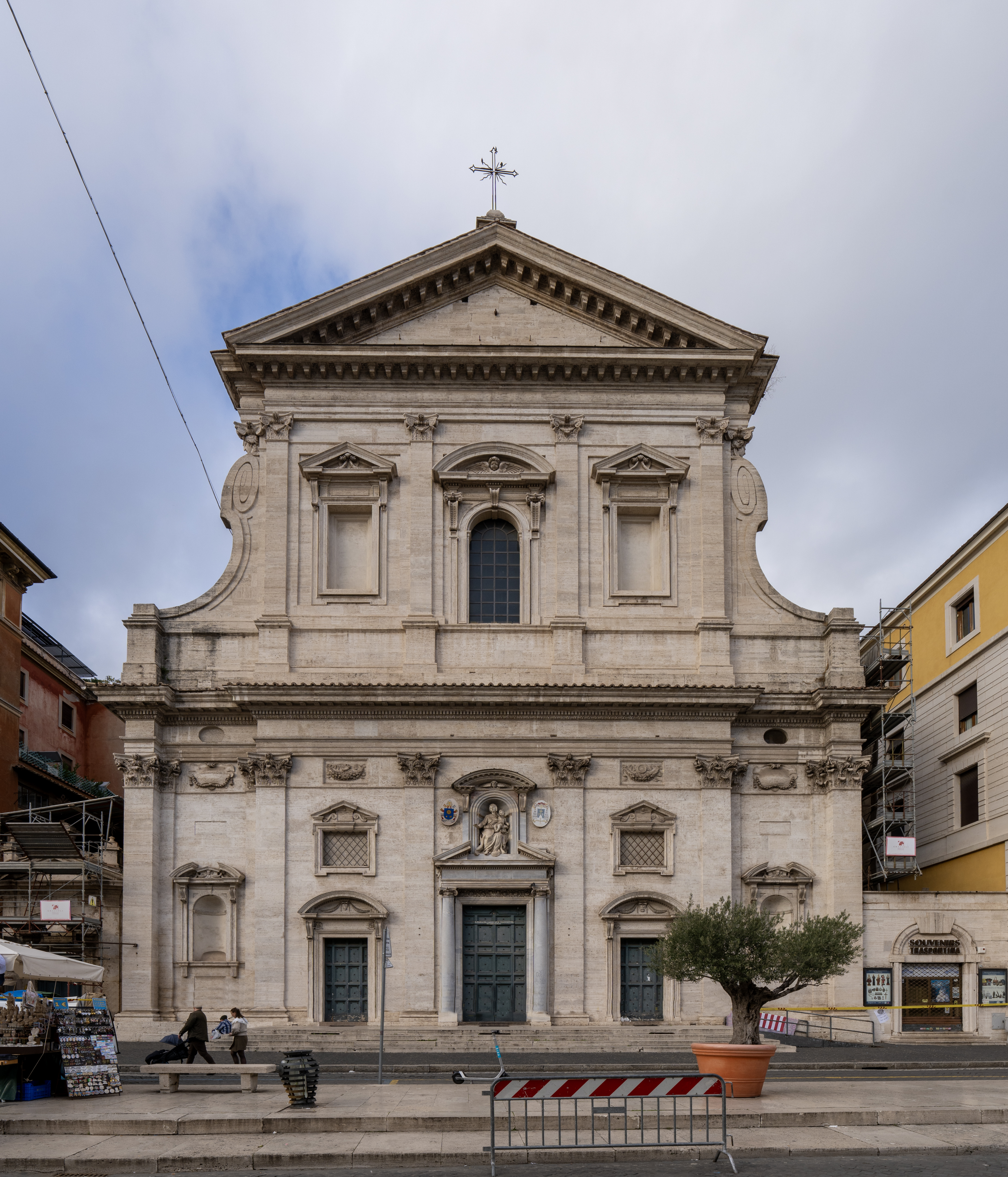
- Façade seen from Via della Conciliazione.
- Click on the map for a fullscreen view.
- 41°54′10″N 12°27′44″E
- Location: Borgo Sant'Angelo 15, Rome
- Country: Italy
- Denomination: Catholic Church
- Tradition: Latin Rite
- Religious order: Carmelites
- Website: parrocchiatraspontina.it

History
- Status: Titular church, national church
- Dedication: Mary, mother of Jesus

Architecture
- Architect: Giovanni Sallustio Peruzzi
- Architectural type: Church
- Style: Baroque
- Groundbreaking: 1566

The Church of Santa Maria del Carmelo in Traspontina (Saint Mary of Carmel Across the Bridge) is a Roman Catholic titular church in Rome, run by the Carmelites. The bridge referred to is the Ponte Sant'Angelo. The church is on the Via della Conciliazione, the primary road of the Roman Rione of Borgo.

Pope Sixtus V designated the church as a cardinalatial titulus on 13 April 1587. The current cardinal of Santa Maria in Traspontina is the former Archbishop of Quebec, Marc Ouellet, who is also the Prefect Emeritus of the Dicastery for Bishops of the Roman Curia. He was Cardinal Priest from 2003 to 2018, and continued there when co-opted to suburbicarian rank.

It is the national church for Danish Catholics.

== History ==
The first church named Santa Maria in Traspontina, which lay much nearer to the Tiber than today's church, was demolished during the pontificate of Pius IV (1559–1565) to clear the line of fire for the cannons of the Castel Sant' Angelo, who wished to practice shooting on the Janiculum, which would have been blocked behind the church.

Designs by Giovanni Sallustio Peruzzi (with contributions by Ottaviano Nonni and Francesco Peparelli) for a replacement church were in place by 1566, though the papal artillery officers insisted that its dome be as low as possible to avoid a recurrence of the previous problem — for this reason this is the only church in Rome whose dome does not lie on a drum. The new church was erected along the North side of Borgo Nuovo, which was at that time - and until its destruction in 1937 - the main road of Borgo.

The inscriptions found in Santa Maria in Traspontina, a valuable source illustrating the history of the church, have been collected and published by Vincenzo Forcella.

On 21 October 2019 Alexander Tschugguel and an accomplice stole five statues, reportedly of Inca fertility goddess Pachamama, from the church and threw them into the Tiber. The statues were on display in one of the church's side chapels as part of an educational installment about Amazonian culture during the Amazon Synod.

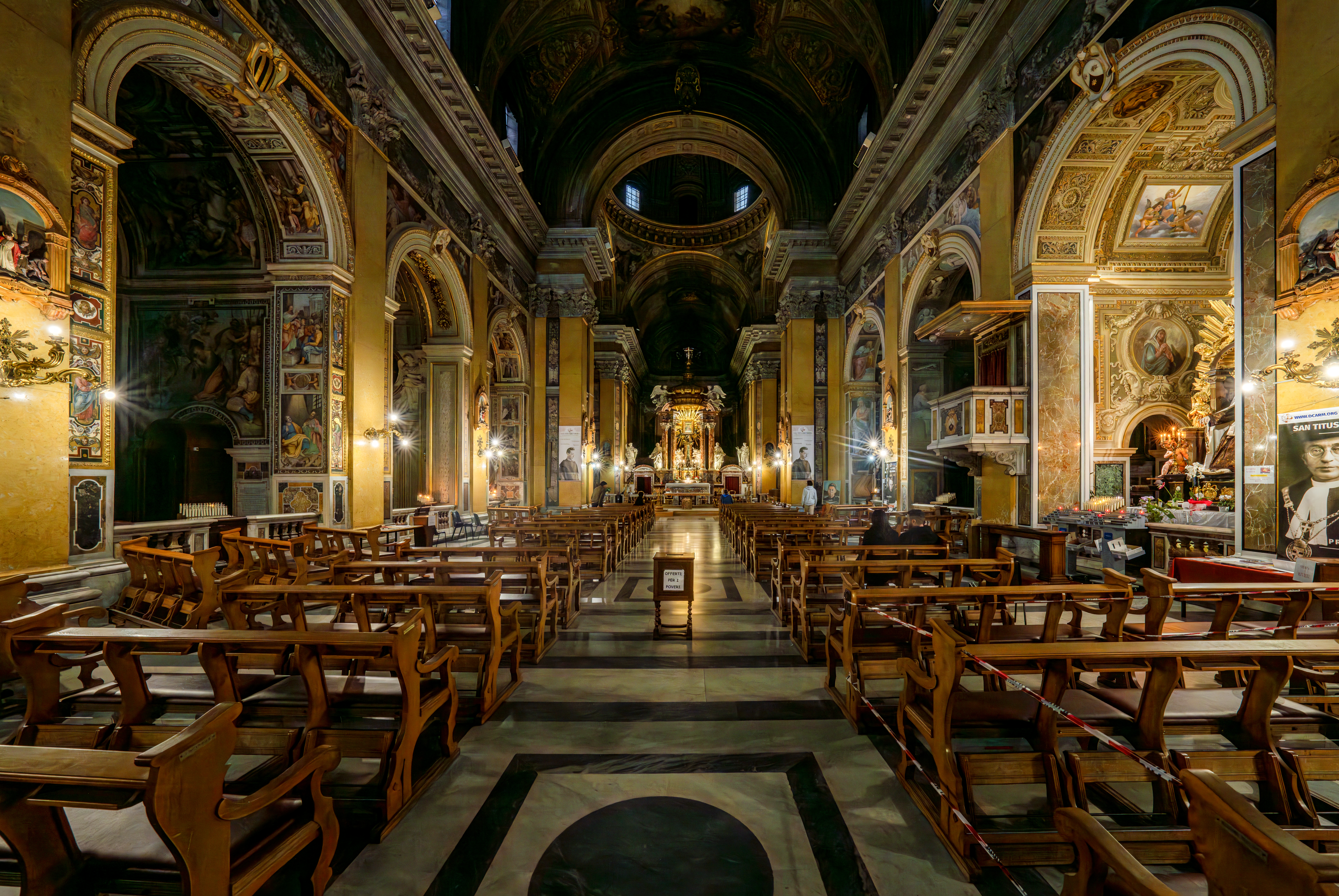
Interior.

== Architecture ==
The façade is built in travertine blocks. The campanile (1637) was designed by Peparelli.

=== Interior ===
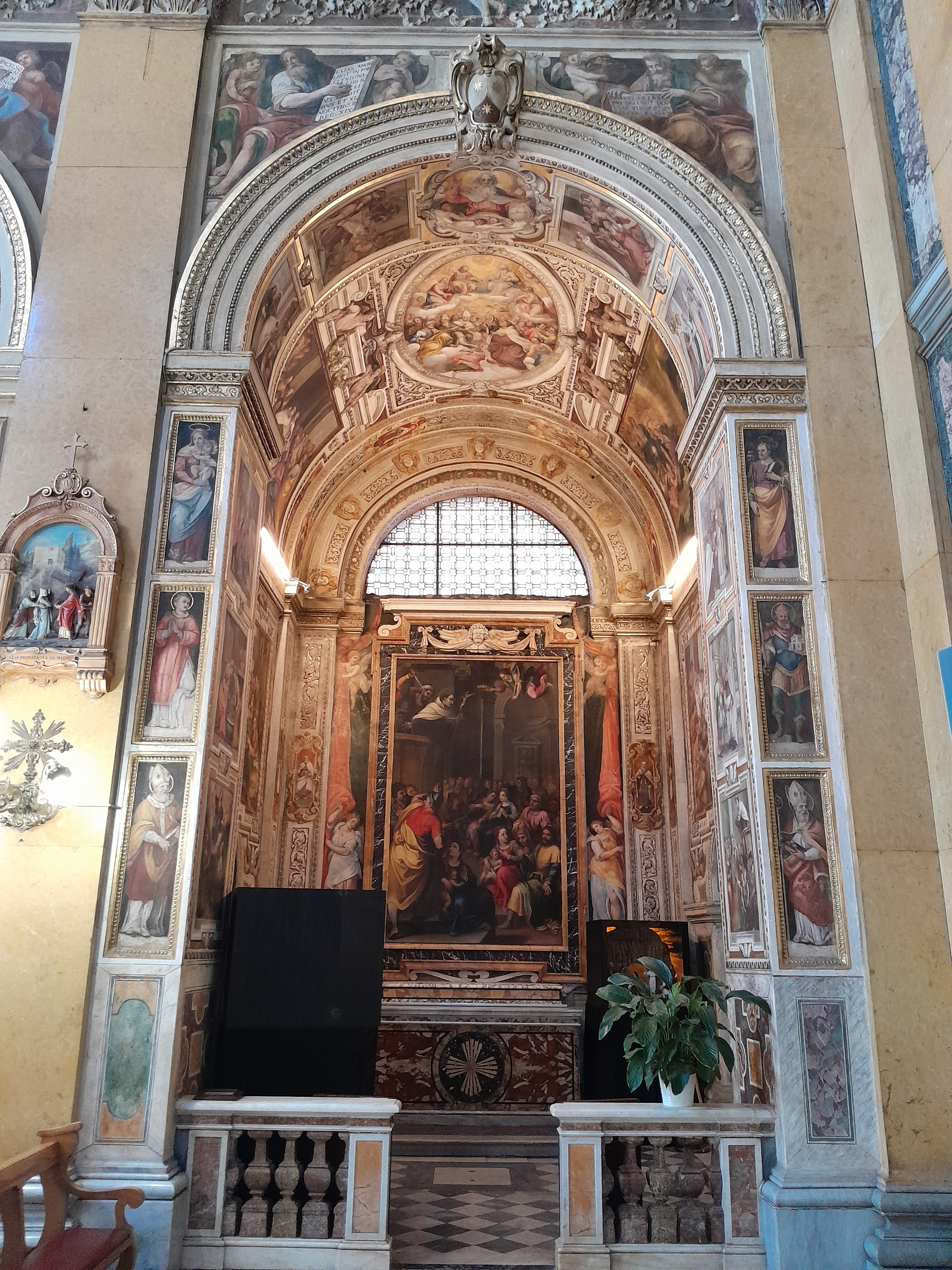
Interior

The main altar (1674) was designed by Carlo Fontana, and has a copy of a medieval icon lost during the period of the Roman Republic (1798–1799). The statues (1695) around the altar are by Alessandro Rondoni, Giacomo Antonio Lavaggi, Vincenzo Felici, and Michel Maille.

The ceiling of the left crossing (1697) was frescoed by Biagio Puccini; the crossing to the right, has an Apparition of the Trinity and 3 saints (1639) by Giovanni Domenico Cerrini. The choir is located behind the main altar, separate from the name. It has paintings (1760) by Angelo Papi.

=== Chapels ===
- Chapel of the Pietà: The first chapel on the left was built by Baldassare Peruzzi. On either side of the altar are two angels in wood sculptured by Ercole Ferrata. This chapel is also the baptistery.
- Chapel of the Prophet Elijah: Second on the left, has an altarpiece depicting Santa Elia with St Anthony Abbot and the blessed Francesco Lippi painted by Giacinto Calandrucci.
- Chapel of SS Peter and Paul: Third on the left, contains the two columns to which Peter and Paul were said to have been bound prior to their martyrdom in the circus of Nero nearby. It has a Flagellation of Saints Peter and Paul by Giovanni Battista Ricci.
- Chapel of St. Teresa of Avila: Fourth on the left, has an altarpiece, the Ecstasy of Santa Teresa (1698) by Antonio Gherardi.

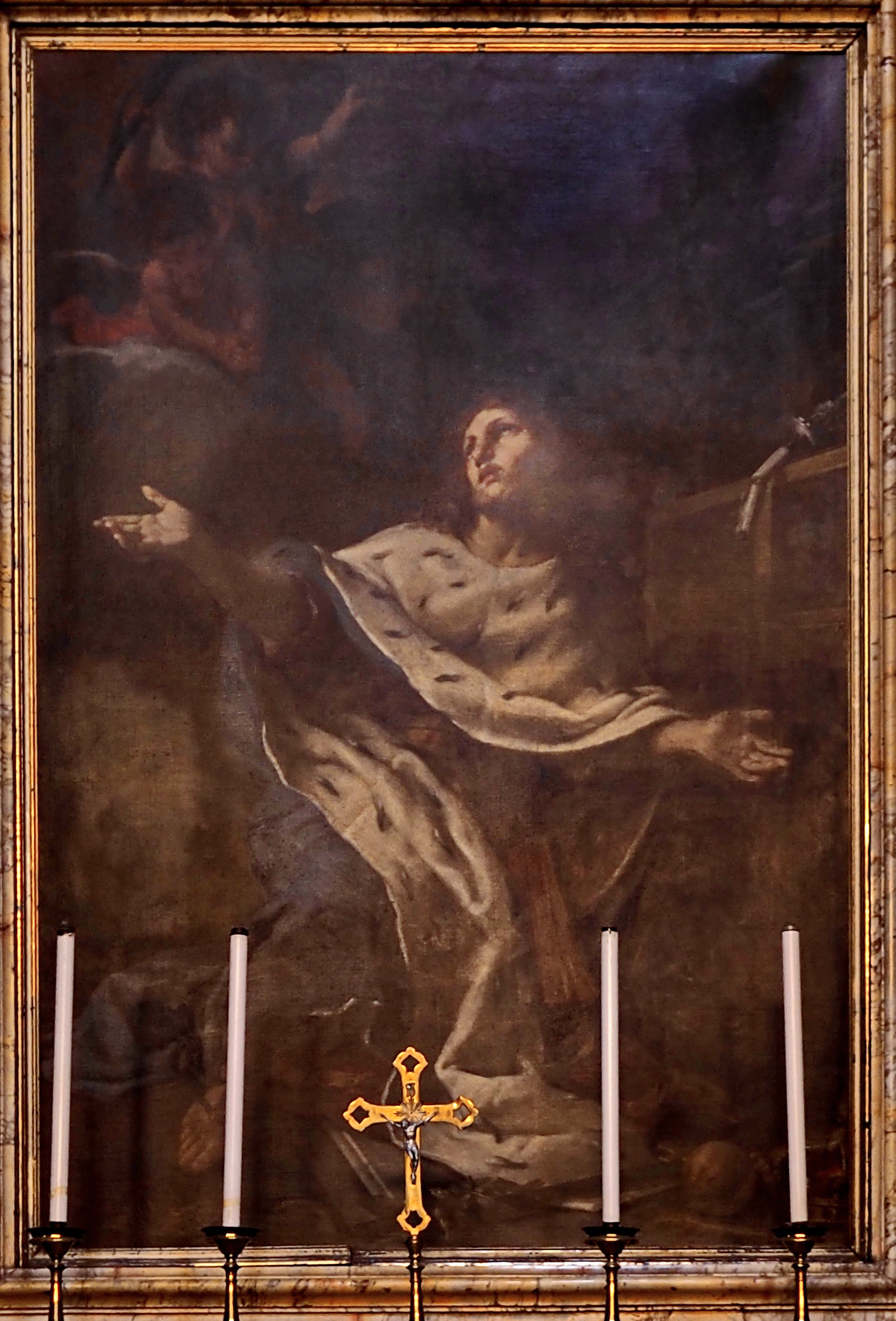
Extasis of Saint Knud by Daniel Seiter

- Chapel of St Angelus of Jerusalem: Fifth chapel on the left, has an altarpiece by Ricci of Preaching by San Angelo Martire (1612) and stories of the saint.
- Chapel of St Andrew Corsini: left transept; in 1684 a painting by Maria de Dominici in honor of St. Andrew was hung in this chapel.
- Chapel of St Barbara:The first on the right, is dedicated to the patron saint of gunners. The chapel was established through donations from the confraternity of bombardiers of Castel Sant'Angelo. This chapel has an altarpiece of Santa Barbara (c. 1597) by Cavalier d'Arpino, with frescoed scenes (1610–20) from the life of the saint by Cesare Rossetti.
- Chapel of St Knud: Second on the right, was established as a Danish chapel in Rome. The altarpiece is the Extasis of S. Canuto (1686) by Daniel Seiter, with frescoed ceiling and lunettes by Alessandro Francesi depicting The Glory of St Knud, with angels carry the saint in triumph to Heaven. King Christian X of Denmark and Queen Alexandrina visited the church in 1920.
- Chapel of Our Lady of Carmel Third on the right,
- Chapel of the Holy Cross: Fourth on the right, has a Madonna & St. John Evangelist (1587) by Cesare Conti with frescoes of the Passion (1649) by Bernardino Gagliardi.
- Chapel of St. Alberto Avogadro: Fifth on the right, the frescoed stories were by Niccolò Circignani.
- Chapel of St Mary Magdalen de' Pazzi: right transept

== Cardinal-priests ==
- Juan Hurtado de Mendoza, 1589–92
- Francisco de Toledo, 1593–96
- Lorenzo Priuli, 1596–1600
- Erminio Valenti, 1604–1618
- Alessandro Ludovisi, 1618–21
- Ludovico Ludovisi, 1621–23
- Federico Baldissera Bartolomeo Cornaro, 1626–27
- Cesare Monti, 1634–50
- Giacomo Corradi, 1652–66
- Giannicolò Conti, 1666–91
- Giuseppe Sacripante, 1696–1721
- Luis Antonio Belluga y Moncada, 1721–26
- Giuseppe Accoramboni, 1728–1740
- Marcello Crescenzi, 1743–68
- Guido Calcagnini, 1776–1807
- Francesco Saverio Castiglione, 1816–21
- Anne Louis Henri de La Fare, 1823–29
- Placido Maria Tadini, 1835–47
- Giuseppe Cosenza, 1850–63
- Gustav Adolf von Hohenlohe-Schillingsfuerst, 1866–79
- Gaetano Alimonda, 1879–91
- Fulco Luigi Ruffo-Scilla, 1891–95
- Camillo Mazzella, 1896–97
- José María Martín de Herrera y de la Iglesia, 1898–1922
- Giovanni Nasalli Rocca di Corneliano, 1923–52
- Giacomo Lercaro, 1953–76
- Gerald Emmett Carter, 1979–2003
- Marc Armand Ouellet, 2003–present

== Books ==
- Rendina, Claudio (2000). Enciclopedia di Roma. Rome: Newton & Compton.
