= Sant'Antonio, Faenza =

Church building in Faenza, Italy

Coordinates: 44°17′5.39″N 11°52′45.12″E

The Church of Sant'Antonio is a late Baroque Roman Catholic church located on piazza San Giacomo della Penna in Faenza, Italy.

== History ==
The present structure was built in 1702 using designs by Carlo Cesare Scaletta. It was built atop an earlier 1400s church, near San Giacomo della Penna, using many of the original external walls. The onion-topped bell tower was also designed by Scaletta, and completed in 1728.

Among the artworks inside are a canvas of the Martyrdom of St Catherine of Alexandria (1580) by Marco Marchetti. This replaces the original baroque engraved wooden and golden altarpiece which was destroyed in a fire on 25 August 1989. In addition, there are paintings by Francesco Bosi from Brisighella (known as “Il Gobbino dei Sinibaldi”), Giovanni Battista Bertucci, and four “Stories of San Antonio of Padua” attributed to Pasquale Tomba.
