= Santa Maria dell'Angelo, Faenza =

Church building in Faenza, Italy

Coordinates: 44.2861°N 11.8797°E

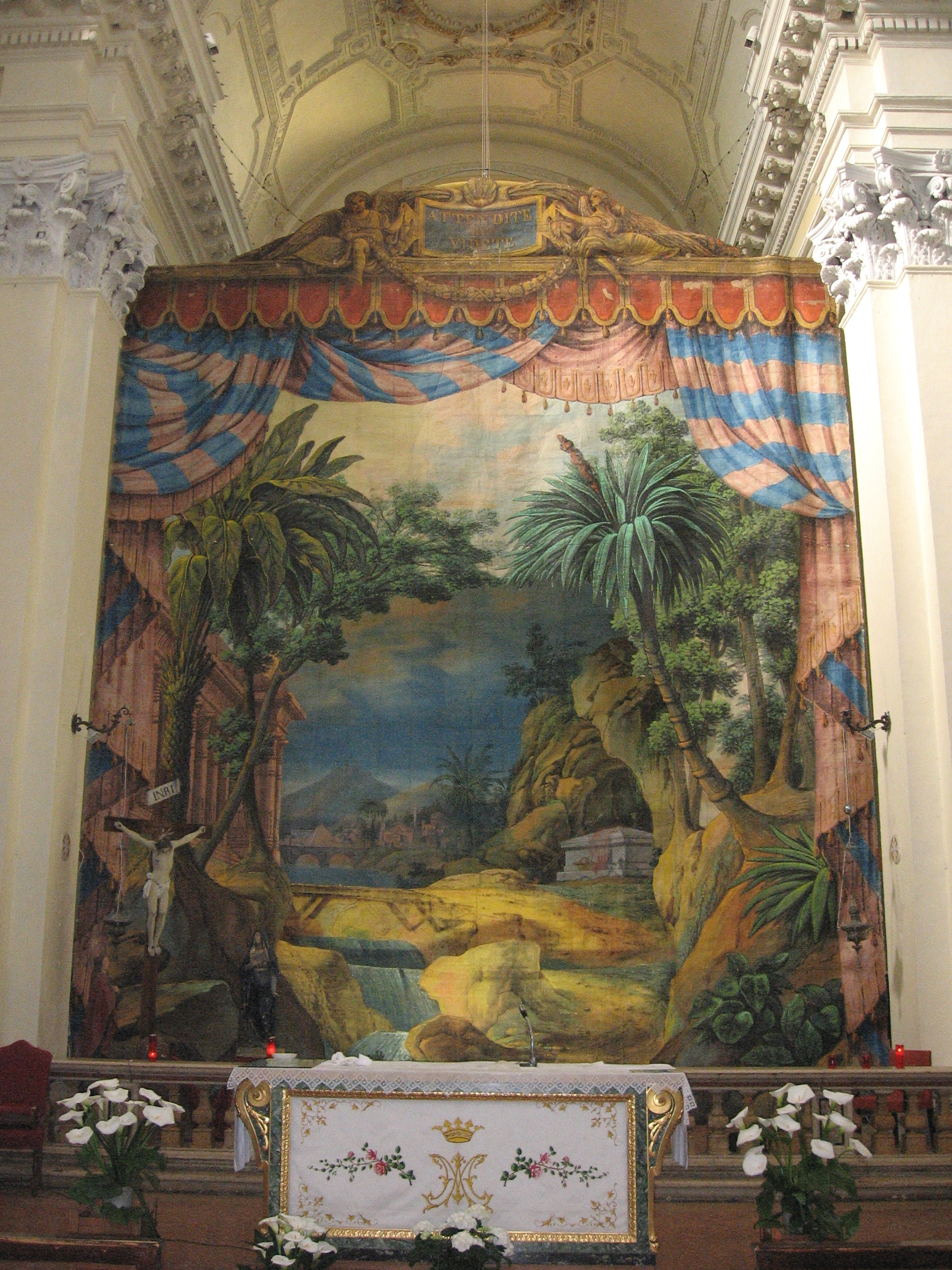

Santa Maria dell'Angelo, also known as Santa Maria Nuova, is a Baroque architecture, Roman Catholic church located on Via Santa Maria dell'Angelo in Faenza, region of Emilia-Romagna, Italy.

Construction was commissioned by the Jesuit Order, and began in 1621, and the cupola was finally erected in 1646, when the original architect Girolamo Rainaldi was substituted by Ercole Fichi. The facade remains incomplete. The main altarpiece, placed here in 1778, painted in a Renaissance style, was by an unknown artist, but attributed by some to Sigismondo Foschi.
