= Giovanni Sallustio Peruzzi =

Italian architect (1510s–1572)

Giovanni Sallustio Peruzzi (1511/12 – between 6 May and 24 November 1572) was an Italian architect.

== Biography ==
Born in Siena, he was the son of architect Baldassare Peruzzi.

In Rome he designed the ceremonial entrance to the Castel Sant'Angelo, and made drawings of his restoration, in section and elevation, of the Mausoleum of Hadrian as it had originally appeared. He designed and began the rebuilding of Santa Maria in Traspontina in the Borgo (from 1566, not finished until 1668), where the travertine for its facade was quarried from the Colosseum. He collaborated with Pirro Ligorio at the Casina of Pope Pius IV. Moreover, he supervised the construction, at the expense of the Jewish community, of the walls of the Roman Ghetto.

After 1567 he went to Vienna, where he worked as an engineer and architect for Emperor Maximilian II.
