= Thomas Gilbert (architect) =

British architect

- Born: 1706
- Died: 1776
- Occupation: Architect
- Buildings: St George's Church, Portland. Queen Anne House, Portland. The Old Rectory, Portland.

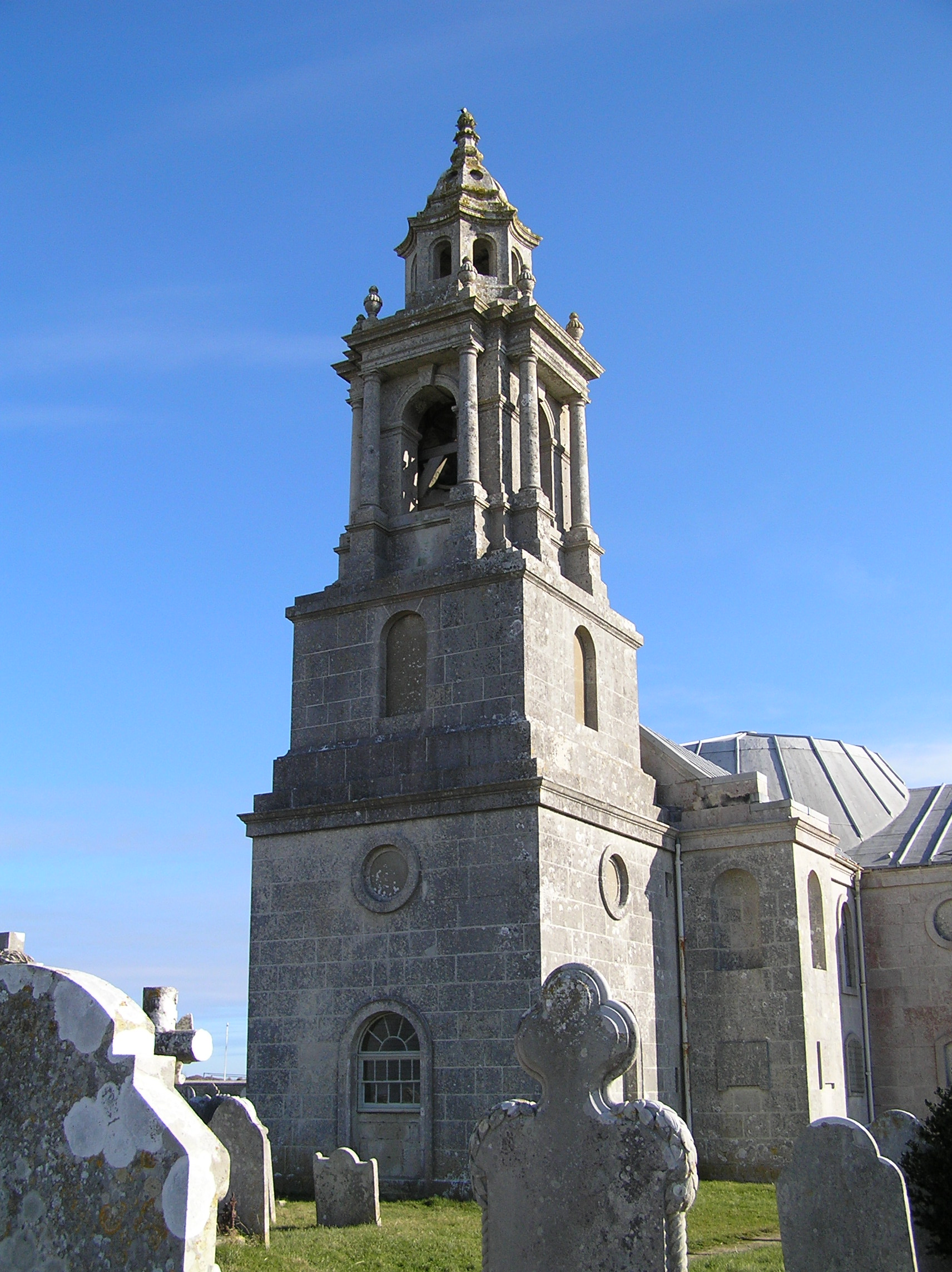
St. George's from the west side of the Church

Thomas Gilbert was a British architect from Portland, Dorset, who lived from 1706 to 1776. He is best known for designing and building St. George's Church on the Isle of Portland. His architectural design, which he applied to the Church, came from Christopher Wren. When he died Thomas Gilbert was buried in the sanctuary of St George's Church. Thomas was the grandson of another Thomas Gilbert (circa 1650 - 1703), Portlands Stone Agent to Sir Christopher Wren during the late 17th century.
