= San Caio =

Coordinates: 41°54′12″N 12°29′35″E

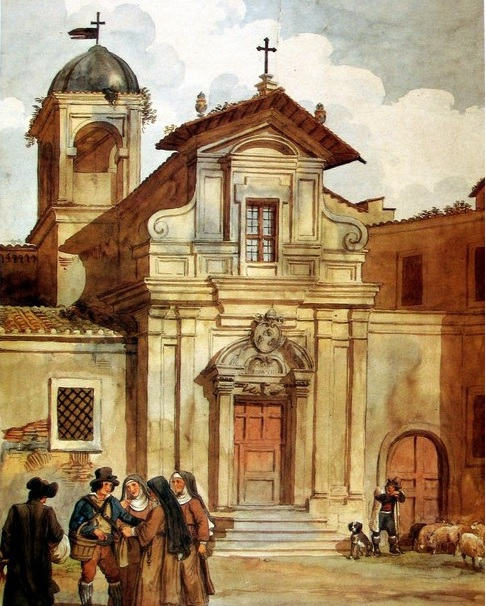
San Caio depicted in watercolor between 1826 and 1835 by Achille Pinelli.

San Caio (English: Saint Caius; sometimes also spelled San Cajo) was an ancient titular church in Rome, possibly dating from as early as the third century. It was demolished in the late nineteenth century.

== Location and description ==
The church of San Caio was located in the Monti rione of the city, along the ancient Via Pia (now enlarged, and called Via XX Settembre), in the vicinity of Porta Pia. There had been a convent of Barberine nuns (Carmelites of the Incarnation) connected to the church.

After a 1630 reconstruction, the church's facade was characterized by two orders of columns, in back of which there was a campanile. The interior was laid out on the pattern of a Latin cross.

On the first altar to the left when entering the church, there was a painting by Mario Balassi depicting the apparition of the Risen Christ to Mary Magdalene. Another altar in the church held a painting of Saint Bernard contemplating Christ the Savior, with the Blessed Virgin, by Giovanni Battista Camassei. The high altar of the church was decorated with a painting by Giovanni Battista Speranza depicting its patron, Saint Caius, in the act of baptizing.

== History ==
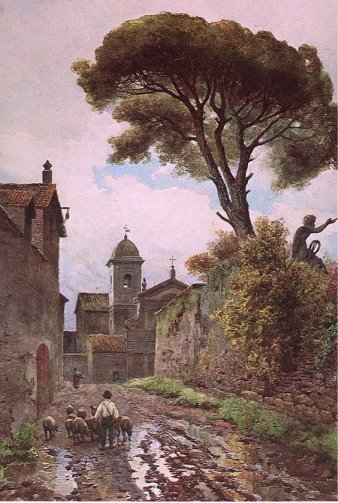
The church of San Caio, as seen down the Vicolo di San Nicola da Tolentino (Ettore Roesler Franz, ca. 1880), painted as part of a series depicting Roma sparita — "forgotten Rome".

=== Early origins ===
Antonio Nibby makes note of a "pious belief" that the church was constructed on the site of the house of Pope Caius, to whose memory the church was dedicated. If that is so, then it had been operating as domus ecclesiæ since the late third century. Mariano Armellini, writing two years after the destruction of the church, notes with some certainty that it had been constructed atop ruins from the third or fourth century. Those appear to have belonged to "a noble and grandiose" Roman structure, which may be identified with the ancient titulus Gai ("title of Caius") — in other words, the early Christian community that met in the house of Pope Caius. As a titular church, San Caio served as one of the Lenten stationes where the pope would preside over a public procession and liturgy. It had been assigned to the Saturday of the third week of Lent.

=== Reconstruction under Pope Urban VIII ===
That ancient church fell into ruins in the early medieval period. The cardinalatial title attached to the titulus Gai was subsequently suppressed by Gregory the Great and transferred to Santi Quattro Coronati, and its Lenten station day was taken by the nearby church of Santa Susanna. A convent operated on the site for another millennium, until Pope Urban VIII decided to clear what remained of the ancient church, and rebuild it from the ground up. To accomplish this, he retained Francesco Peparelli and Vincenzo della Greca as architects; the works lasted from 1630 to 1631. The relics of Saint Caius were then brought out of the Catacomb of Callixtus, and brought into the newly rebuilt church dedicated to him.

=== Demolition ===
In 1878, the church was demolished along with its adjacent monastery in connection with the construction of the Italian Ministry of Defense building and the long boulevard next to it, Via XX Settembre. In particular, the San Caio was removed in order to make room for Via Firenze, which connects Via XX Settembre to Via Nazionale. After the destruction of the church, the remains of Saint Caius were transferred to a private chapel of the Barberini family.
