= Nathaniel Hill Brick House =

Historic house in New York, United States

- U.S. National Register of Historic Places
- The house in 2007
- Location: Town of Montgomery, NY
- Nearest city: Newburgh
- Coordinates: 41°31′30″N 74°10′34″W
- Built: 1768
- Architectural style: Georgian
- NRHP reference No.: 78001893
- Added to NRHP: 1978

The Nathaniel Hill Brick House, locally referred to as just the Brick House, is located on NY 17K in the Orange County, New York Town of Montgomery. It was built in 1768 by Hill, one of the earliest settlers of the region. His family has lived there ever since. Nathaniel Hill was born in 1705, emigrated from Ireland in about 1725, and died May 5, 1780. At the time of his death, he was the owner and possessor of some 700 acres (2.8 km^{2}) of land. Hill originally built a home in the town of Crawford, New York, which he only lived in for two years. He left that home to his son James, who made Applejack Brandy there. The first public record of Hill is his enlistment in Captain Bayard's militia in 1738.

The Brick House was passed down for seven generations, from Nathaniel Hill, to Captain Peter Hill (July 22, 1752 – October 14, 1795), to Nathaniel Peter Hill (Feb. 14, 1781 – May 2, 1841), to Augustus Hill (May 4, 1838 – November 2, 1903) to Charles Borland Hill (June 5, 1868 – 1959), to C.B. Hill Jr. (Nov. 30, 1901–?), to C.B. Hill III (May 26, 1931–?). But it was originally made as a retirement house for Nathaniel Hill.

The house was featured in Good Housekeeping magazine, the December 1968 edition.

The house was donated by C.B. Hill Jr. on Dec. 26, 1975, to the County of Orange, it was entered on the National Register of Historic Places on Jan. 5, 1978, and opened as a museum June 22, 1978.

Much of the original design and appointments (including some Chippendale furniture pieces) remain, though improvements have been made. In the 1830s the Hills added a large rear wing to the house and renovated part of the interior; almost a century later indoor plumbing was added.

The Hills have cooperated with the county in allowing the land around the house to be used as a park, and the Orange County Farmers' Museum. It and their house are open 10 a.m. – 4:30 p.m. on weekends between mid-May and early October (actual dates vary each year). Admission is $3 for adults and $2 for children.
