= Church of Saints Peter and Paul, Arad =

Serbian Orthodox Church in Arad, Romania

Church of Saints Peter and Paul
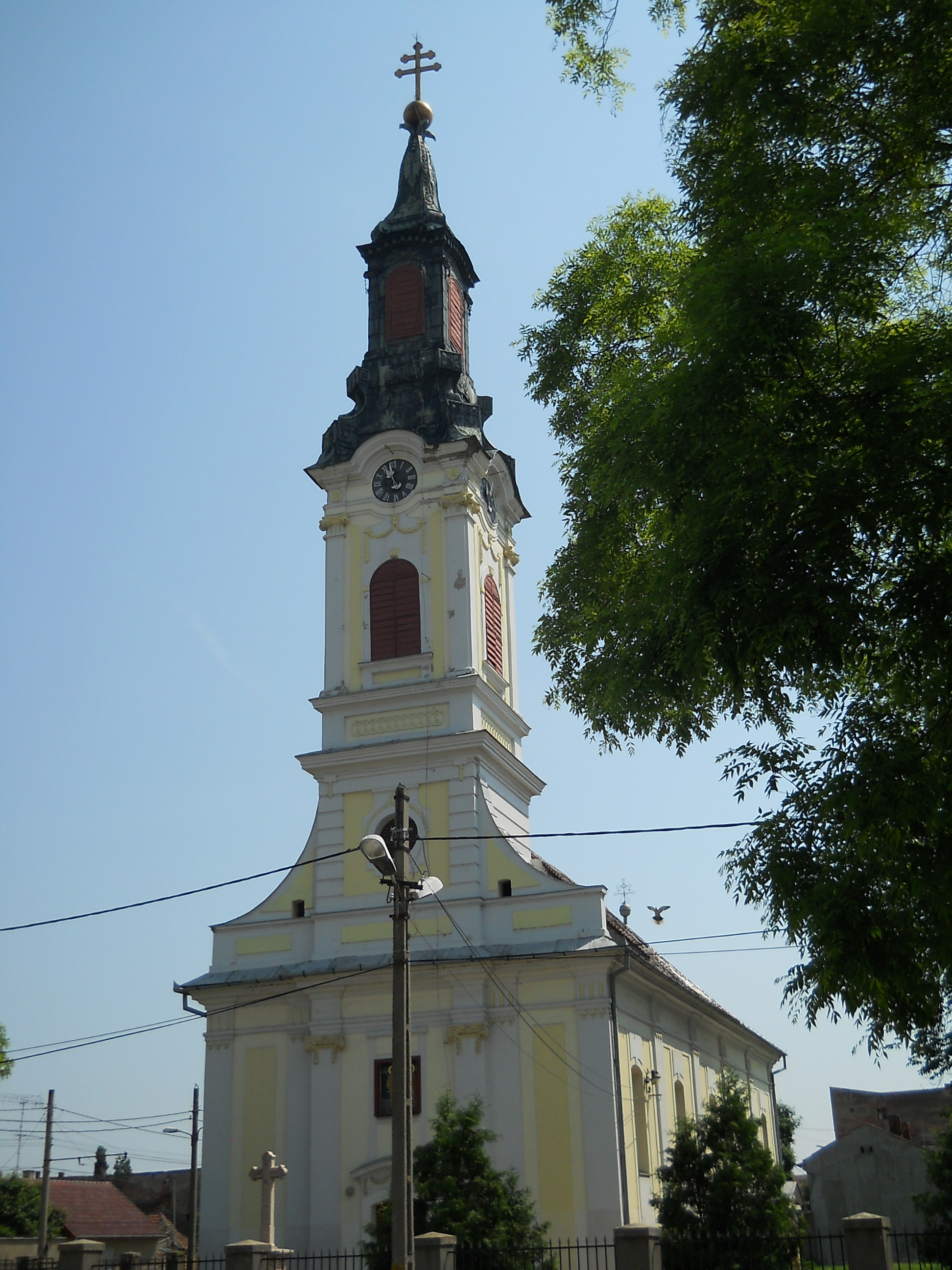
- Biserica Sârbească

- The Serbian Church of Sts. Peter and Paul in Arad shown within Romania

Religion
- Affiliation: Serbian Orthodox Church

Location
- Location: Strada Preparandiei, Arad, Romania
- Interactive map of Church of Saints Peter and Paul
- Coordinates: 46.166823°N 21.311583°E

Architecture
- Completed: 1702

The Church of Saints Peter and Paul (Serbian: Црква светих апостола Петра и Павла, romanized: Crkva svetih apostola Petra i Pavla), also known as the Serbian Church (Romanian: Biserica Sârbească), is an Eastern Orthodox church located in the Serbian Square (Romanian: Piata Sârbească), Arad, Romania. It is under jurisdiction of the Eparchy of Temišvar of the Serbian Orthodox Church.

It was built between 1698 and 1702, by the Serb community of the city, and represents one of the oldest buildings in Arad. During the Great Turkish War (1683-1699), the city of Arad came under Habsburg rule, and Serbian captain Subota Jović was appointed commander of Arad in 1691. The border with the Ottoman Empire was set on the Mureș River, and thus the region of Pomorišje around Arad was organized as a Military Frontier, inhabited by Serbs who served in frontier units.

As a consequence, a church was built in the biggest city of the area, Arad. The building was financed by Serbian officer and nobleman Jovan Tekelija. Artist Stefan Tenecki painted the icons of the iconostasis in the second half of the 18th century. Throughout the 18th century, the church was center of religious life for all Eastern Orthodox Christians in Arad, both Serbs and Romanians, and also Greeks and Aromanians. Until the ecclesiastical division in 1865, the church belonged to the Eparchy of Arad, under the jurisdiction of the Serbian Orthodox Metropolitanate of Karlovci, and since then it belongs to the Eparchy of Temišvar.

== See also ==
- Eparchy of Timișoara
- Serbs of Romania

== Sources ==
- Ćirković, Sima (2004). The Serbs. Malden: Blackwell Publishing. ISBN 978-1-4051-4291-5.
- Gavrilović, Slavko (1993). "Serbs in Hungary, Slavonia and Croatia in struggles against the Turks (15th–18th centuries)". Serbs in European Civilization. Belgrade: Nova, Serbian Academy of Sciences and Arts, Institute for Balkan Studies. pp. 41–54. ISBN 978-86-7583-015-3.
- Sotirović, Vladislav B. (2011). "The Serbian Patriarchate of Peć in the Ottoman Empire: The First Phase (1557–94)" (PDF). Serbian Studies. 25 (2): 143–169. doi:10.1353/ser.2011.0038. Archived from the original (PDF) on 10 August 2016.
- Stojkovski, Boris; Ivanić, Ivana; Spăriosu, Laura (2018). "Serbian-Romanian Relations in the Middle Ages until the Ottoman Conquest" (PDF). Transylvanian Review. 27 (2): 217–229. Archived from the original (PDF) on 2 June 2020.
- Točanac-Radović, Isidora (2022). "The Great Migration of Serbs and the Question of the Serbian Ethnic and Religious Community in the Habsburg Monarchy". Migrations in the Slavic Cultural Space: From the Middle Ages to the Present Day. Łódź: Łódź University Press. pp. 15–27. ISBN 978-83-8331-033-6.
