= Vincenzo della Greca =

Italian architect

Vincenzo della Greca (February 5, 1592 – 1661) was an Italian architect.

== Biography ==
While Della Greca born in Palermo, Sicily, most of his work was in Rome and surroundings. In 1623 he worked on the Castel Sant'Angelo in Rome as well as fortifications commissioned by Pope Urban VIII. In 1630, the design and construction of the church of San Caio in Rome is attributed to Della Greca; the church was demolished in 1885. Della Greca worked on Santa Maria delle Grazie, in Marino.

His major work was the Church of the convent of Santi Domenico e Sisto which now serves as the University Church of the Pontifical University of Saint Thomas Aquinas, Angelicum. The church was a collaboration between him and the architects Giacomo Della Porta, Orazio Torriani, and Giovanni Battista Soria. Della Greca replaced the latter at his death. Della Greca completed its facade in 1655.
