= Faenza =

Italian comune

Faenza Fènza / Fẽza (Romagnol)
- Comune
- Città di Faenza
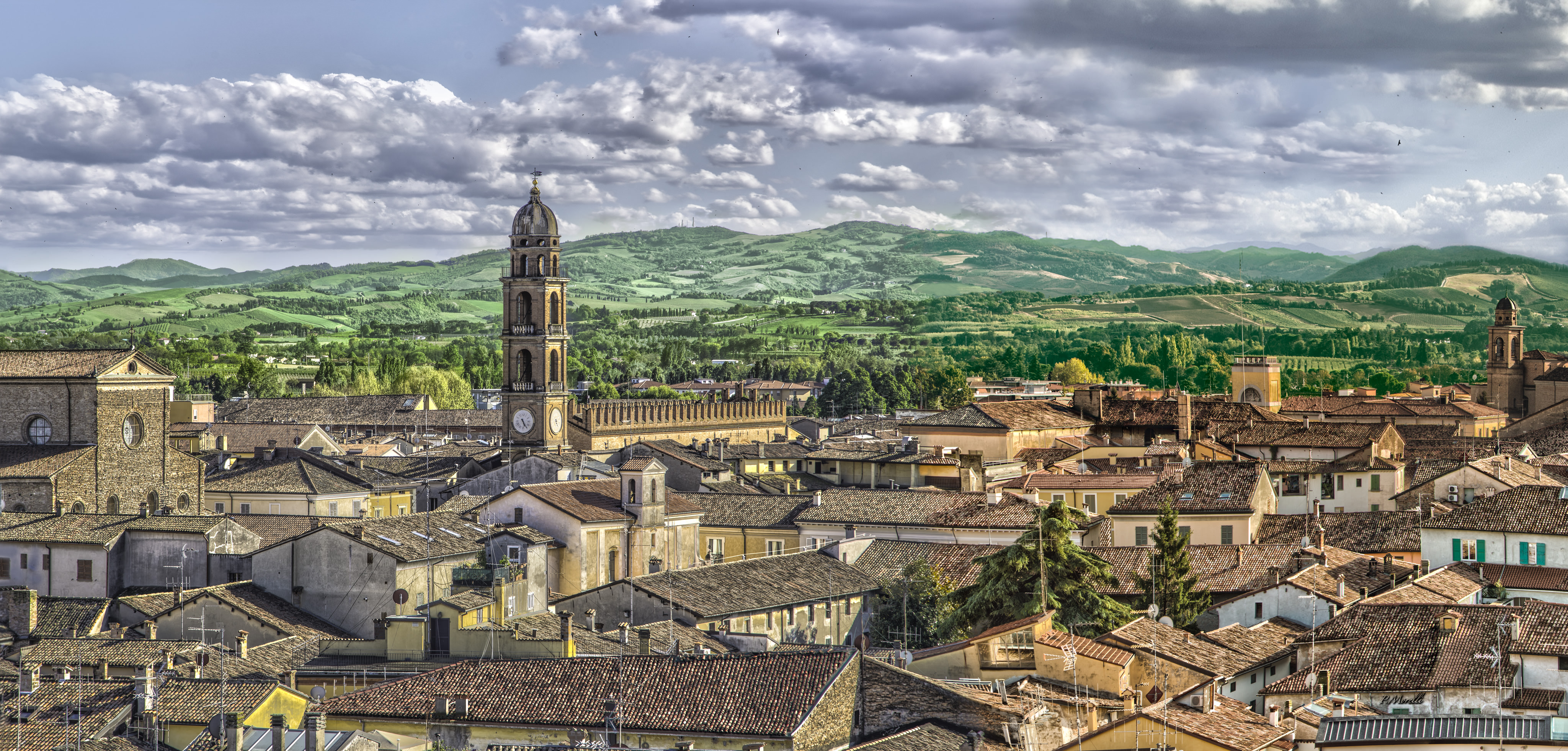

- Flag Coat of arms
- Nickname: City of Ceramics
- Faenza within the Province of Ravenna

- Location within Italy Location within Emilia-Romagna
- Coordinates: 44°17′08″N 11°53′00″E
- Country: Italy
- Region: Emilia-Romagna
- Province: Ravenna (RA)
- Frazioni: Albereto, Borgo Tuliero, Castel Raniero, Celle, Cosina, Errano, Granarolo, Mezzeno, Oriolo dei Fichi, Pieve Cesato, Pieve Ponte, Prada, Reda, San Biagio, Sant'Andrea, Santa Lucia,

Government
  - Mayor: Massimo Isola

Area
  - Total: 215.72 km^{2} (83.29 sq mi)
- Elevation: 34 m (112 ft)

Population (31 July 2025)
  - Total: 58,746
  - Density: 272.33/km^{2} (705.32/sq mi)
- Demonym(s): Faentini, Manfredi
- Time zone: UTC+1 (CET)
  - Summer (DST): UTC+2 (CEST)
- Postal code: 48018
- Dialing code: 0546
- Patron saint: Madonna of the Graces
- Saint day: 17 June
- Website: Official website
- Additional information
- Neighboring municipalities: Bagnacavallo, Brisighella, Castel Bolognese, Cotignola, Riolo Terme, Russi, Solarolo, Forlì (FC)
- Seismic classification: Zone 2 (medium seismicity)
- Climate classification: Zone E, 2,263 DD

Faenza (UK: /fɑːˈɛntsə/ fah-ENT-sə, US: /fɑːˈɛnzə/ fah-EN-zə, Italian: [faˈɛntsa]; Romagnol: Fènza or Fẽza; Latin: Faventia) is a comune (municipality) with 58,746 inhabitants in the Province of Ravenna in Emilia-Romagna, Italy. The city is historically renowned for its production of artistic ceramics, to the extent that maiolica, due to the fame of local craftsmanship, is known worldwide as faience.

Under the rule of the Manfredi, Faenza entered a period of significant growth that peaked during the Renaissance and Baroque eras, shaping its art and architecture. Due to its vibrant artistic and cultural activity, between the 18th and 19th centuries, it became a prominent center of Neoclassicism in Italy and Europe, with the finest example today being the National Museum of Palazzo Milzetti.

Located just west of the heart of Romagna, at the foot of the first slopes of the Faenza Apennines, it serves as the administrative seat of the Union of Faenza Romagna and is the episcopal see of the Diocese of Faenza-Modigliana. The economy is based on a productive system that includes agricultural, manufacturing, mechanical, agri-food, and service activities, linked to ceramic production and integrated with research and innovation activities in the fields of advanced materials, environmental sustainability, and technologies applied to agriculture and industry.

Faenza is recognized as an area with an established ceramic tradition according to the National Ceramic Council. In October 2025, it received the designation of “UNESCO Creative City for Crafts and Folk Arts”.

== Geography ==
=== Territory ===
The municipality of Faenza is situated in Romagna, in the southwestern part of the Province of Ravenna, along the Lamone River and the Via Emilia, between Imola to the west and Forlì to the east, both approximately 15 km from the city center. It is 35 km from Ravenna, about 40 km from Cesena, and 55 km from Bologna.

The city lies in a foothill area at the boundary between the Po Valley and the initial hills of the Faenza Apennines. The official elevation is 35 meters above sea level, while the municipal territory ranges from a minimum of 13 meters to a maximum of 220 meters above sea level.

The territory of Faenza features an agricultural landscape, divided between vineyards on the hilly slopes and cultivated fields, with traces of ancient Roman centuriation in the plains.

- Seismic classification: Zone 2

=== Climate ===
Due to its location, Faenza experiences a humid temperate climate with hot summers, exhibiting subcontinental characteristics (according to Mario Pinna), influenced by the orographic lift effect of the adjacent hilly areas.

- Climate classification: Zone E
- Köppen climate classification: Cfa

Climate data for Faenza (1991–2020)
Month	Jan	Feb	Mar	Apr	May	Jun	Jul	Aug	Sep	Oct	Nov	Dec	Year
Record high °C (°F)	21.0 (69.8)	21.8 (71.2)	29.4 (84.9)	32.0 (89.6)	36.0 (96.8)	40.2 (104.4)	42.5 (108.5)	41.5 (106.7)	37.2 (99.0)	31.8 (89.2)	24.8 (76.6)	19.4 (66.9)	42.5 (108.5)
Mean daily maximum °C (°F)	7.4 (45.3)	10.4 (50.7)	15.7 (60.3)	19.8 (67.6)	25.1 (77.2)	29.5 (85.1)	32.6 (90.7)	32.3 (90.1)	26.5 (79.7)	20.1 (68.2)	13.4 (56.1)	8.0 (46.4)	20.1 (68.1)
Daily mean °C (°F)	3.9 (39.0)	5.6 (42.1)	10.2 (50.4)	14.1 (57.4)	19.1 (66.4)	23.3 (73.9)	25.9 (78.6)	25.7 (78.3)	20.7 (69.3)	15.5 (59.9)	9.8 (49.6)	4.7 (40.5)	14.9 (58.8)
Mean daily minimum °C (°F)	0.4 (32.7)	0.9 (33.6)	4.8 (40.6)	8.4 (47.1)	13.1 (55.6)	17.1 (62.8)	19.3 (66.7)	19.2 (66.6)	14.9 (58.8)	11.0 (51.8)	6.2 (43.2)	1.4 (34.5)	9.7 (49.5)
Record low °C (°F)	−8.3 (17.1)	−13.0 (8.6)	−7.2 (19.0)	−1.5 (29.3)	4.8 (40.6)	9.2 (48.6)	10.4 (50.7)	10.2 (50.4)	6.2 (43.2)	1.0 (33.8)	−3.4 (25.9)	−10.3 (13.5)	−13.0 (8.6)
Average precipitation mm (inches)	48.7 (1.92)	56.6 (2.23)	67.2 (2.65)	73.7 (2.90)	61.4 (2.42)	57.6 (2.27)	36.0 (1.42)	49.2 (1.94)	77.2 (3.04)	88.8 (3.50)	89.6 (3.53)	67.8 (2.67)	773.8 (30.49)
Source: Arpae Emilia-Romagna

== History ==
The history of Faenza begins in the Roman era, though the city's origins are not precisely defined. Among the early hypotheses is one tied to mythology, but more accurate information emerges from the Roman conquest in the 2nd century BC. Roman dominion over the territory ended in 774 when Charlemagne ceded it to the Papal States. During the Middle Ages, the communal system, widespread in northern Italy, took hold. In this period, the Manfredi family consolidated its power, becoming one of the city's most influential families. Amid numerous conflicts with the Empire, particularly with Frederick II, due to Faenza's allegiance to the Lombard League, the city faced several sieges. In the 16th century, it came under papal control and later emerged as a significant Neoclassical center in Italy. From the last two decades of the 19th century, Faenza experienced notable development but suffered multiple bombings during World War II before its liberation by the Allies.

=== Symbols ===
Coat of arms

The symbol of the municipality, depicted on its coat of arms, is a rampant lion. The official description of the coat of arms is recorded in the decree of recognition dated 5 July 1928, issued by the then head of government Benito Mussolini, preserved at the Municipal Library of Faenza:

Argent, a lion gules, armed, langued, and crowned or, grasping with the right forepaw a sword proper, hilted or, positioned in bend sinister. Chief azure, charged with five fleurs-de-lis or, arranged in fess, between a label of six pendants, gules. External ornaments of a Comune.

The symbol first appears on a seal, likely from the 14th century, with the inscription "Sigillum Comunis et Populi Civitatis Favencie". The chief of Anjou, a typical Guelph symbol, features five fleurs-de-lis instead of the usual three, alternating with six pendants of the label instead of four. The shield is topped with a city crown.

The gonfalon is a drape divided per fess into white and azure.

=== Honors ===
Title of City – ribbon for ordinary uniform

Title of City

Faenza is among the cities decorated with military valor for the War of Liberation, awarded the War Cross of Military Valor for the sacrifices of its people and its role in the partisan struggle during World War II. It is a member of the National Institute of the Blue Ribbon, which unites all combatants decorated with military valor:

Medal of Military Valor – ribbon for ordinary uniform

Medal of Military Valor

Faenza was among the first Italian cities to celebrate Europe Day and the third in Italy to receive the Europe Prize in 1968 from the Parliamentary Assembly of the Council of Europe, for its efforts in promoting the European ideal.

== Monuments and places of interest ==
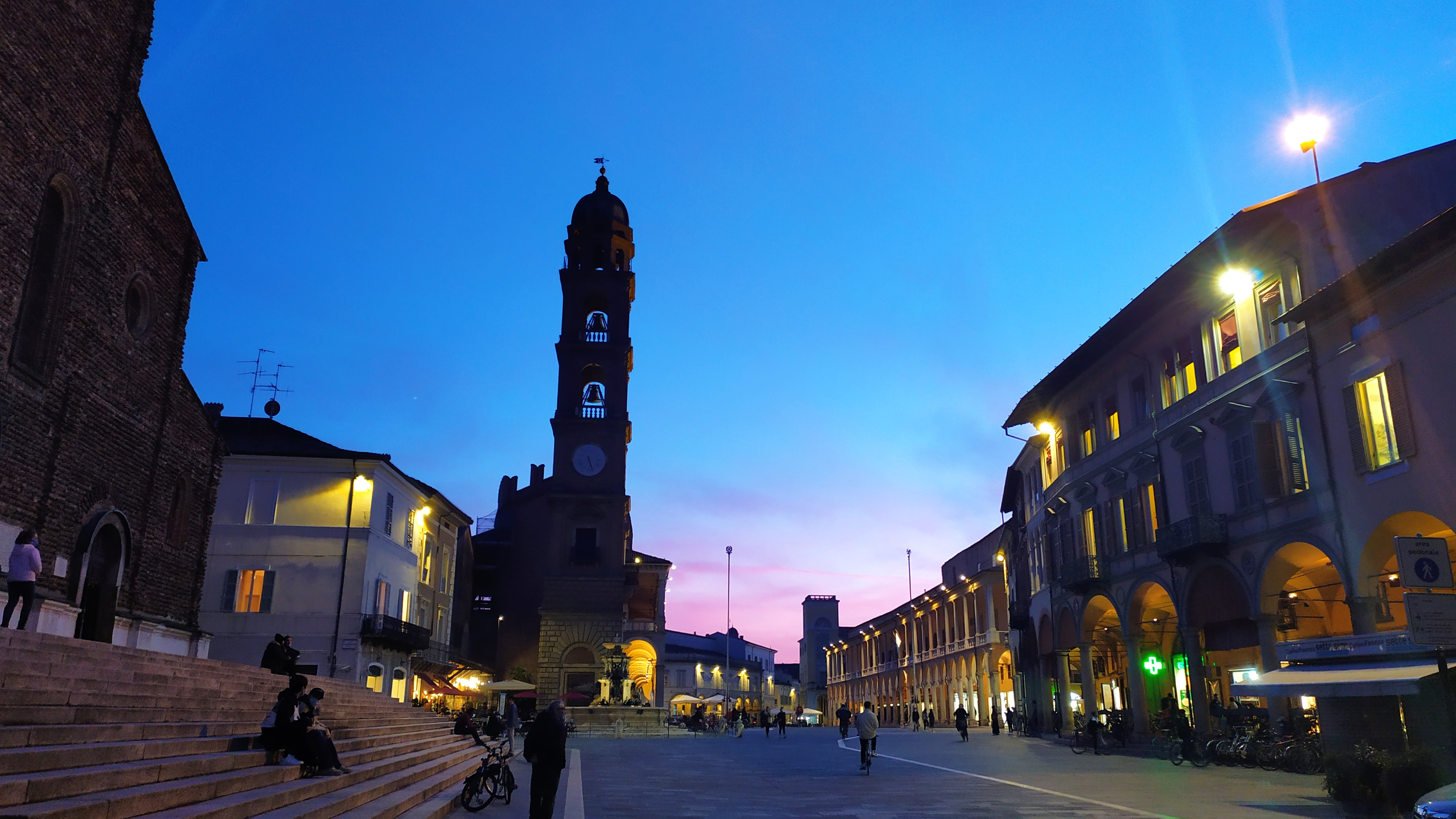
Evening panorama of the city center from Piazza della Libertà

Faenza's urban history, like that of many other Emilia-Romagna cities, unfolds through a continuous process of regeneration from its original Roman structure. While this structure was significantly altered in some cases, it persists in the city's geometric layout. The urban fabric, heavily impacted by wartime destruction, retains numerous examples of Renaissance and Baroque architecture, primarily concentrated in the city center, but is predominantly characterized by 18th- and 19th-century Neoclassical features due to significant building transformations led by architects Giuseppe Pistocchi, Giovanni Antonio Antolini, and Pietro Tomba. These efforts positioned Faenza as a leading center of Neoclassicism in Europe.

=== Religious architecture ===
The oldest surviving building in Faenza, largely intact, is the bell tower of Santa Maria ad Nives, or Santa Maria Vecchia (the original church dating to the 6th century, later rebuilt), constructed between the 9th and 10th century. Another surviving monument from around the year 1000 is the crypt of the Church of Santi Ippolito. The oldest fully preserved church is the Church of the Commenda, dating to around 1100.

The main place of worship for Catholicism in the city is the Cathedral of San Pietro Apostolo, the mother church of the Diocese of Faenza-Modigliana. Its construction, designed by Giuliano da Maiano, began in 1474 and was not completed before 1515, with the facade remaining unfinished. It was consecrated to Saint Peter in 1581.

Below is a list of the main religious buildings built within the municipal territory:

In the city

- Cathedral of San Pietro Apostolo
- Church of Santi Ippolito e Lorenzo
- Church of the Commenda
- Church of Santa Maria ad Nives
- Church of the Servi
- Church of the Carmine
- Church of the Beata Vergine del Paradiso
- Church of San Bartolomeo
- Church of San Domenico
- Church of San Filippo Neri or del Suffragio
- Church of San Francesco
- Church of San Giacomo della Penna
- Church of San Giovanni di Dio
- Church of San Girolamo all'Osservanza
- Church of San Giuseppe Artigiano
- Church of San Rocco
- Church of San Savino
- Church of San Sigismondo
- Church of San Vitale
- Church of Santa Margherita
- Church of Santa Maria dell'Angelo
- Church of Santa Maria Maddalena
- Church of Sant'Agostino
- Church of Sant'Antonino
- Church of Sant'Antonio
- Church of Sant'Umiltà
- Oratory of the Santissima Annunziata

In the countryside

- Church of Santa Caterina (in Tebano)
- Church of Santa Margherita in Rivalta
- Church of Santa Maria degli Angeli (in Sarna)
- Church of Santa Maria del Rosario in Errano
- Church of Santa Maria in Merlaschio
- Church of Santa Maria in Mezzeno
- Church of San Lazzaro
- Church of Sant'Apollinare in Oriolo
- Parish church of Corleto
- Parish church of Sarna
- Parish church of San Giovanni Battista
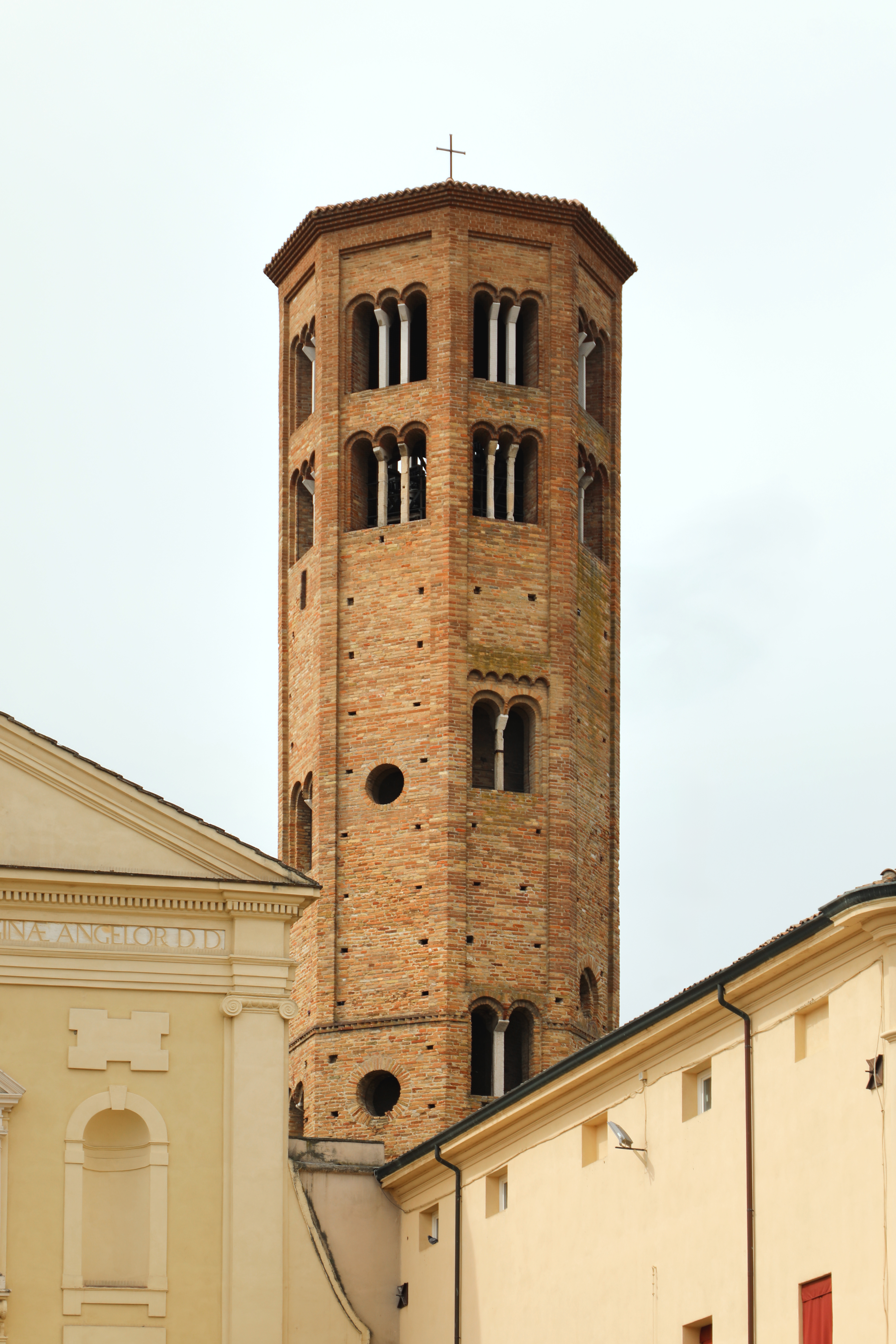
The bell tower of the Church of Santa Maria ad Nives

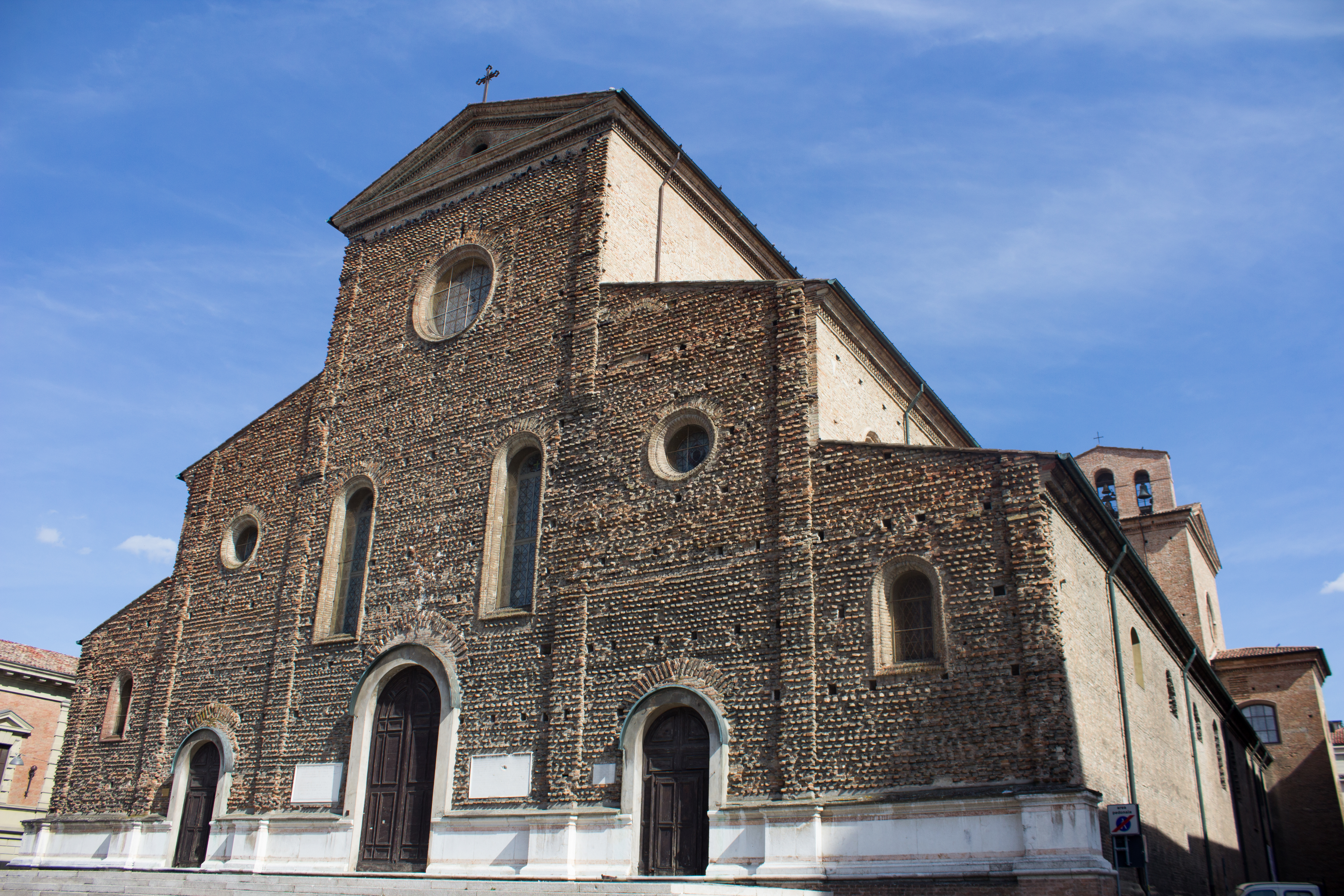
The Cathedral (San Pietro Apostolo)

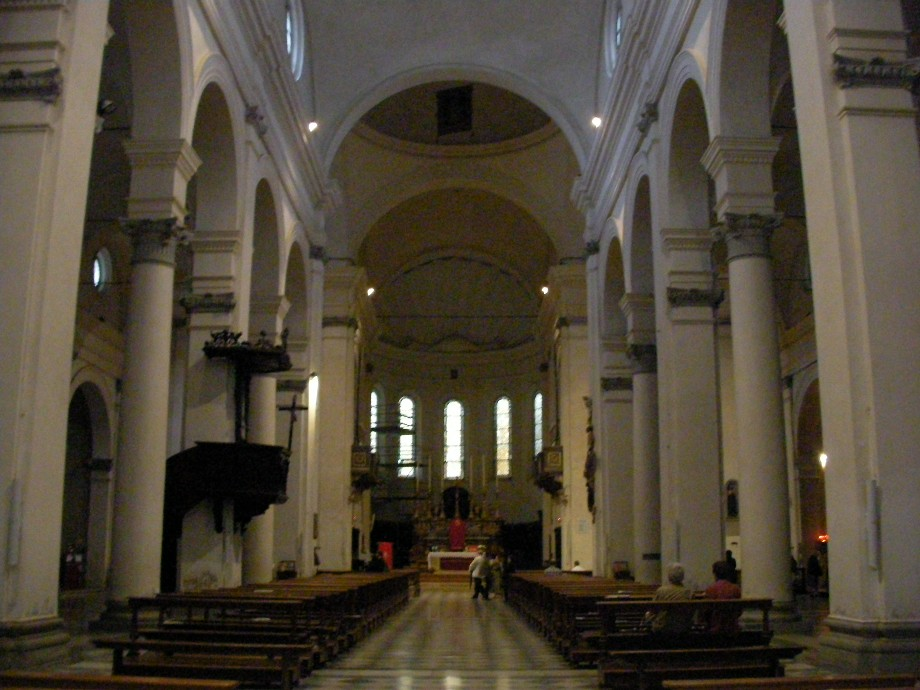
Interior of the Cathedral

The main cemeteries are:

- Osservanza Cemetery: The city's monumental cemetery, named after the adjacent monastery, featuring numerous tombs designed by artists such as Felice Giani, Lucio Fontana, and Domenico Rambelli.
- Faenza War Cemetery: Known as the "English Cemetery," it houses the graves of soldiers who died during the World War II liberation campaigns, recognized by the Commonwealth War Graves Commission.

=== Civil architecture ===
==== Clock Tower ====
The Civic Tower (or Clock Tower), located at the entrance to Piazza del Popolo at the intersection of the Roman cardo and decumanus of Faventia, is one of the city's most iconic architectural landmarks. The original design is attributed to Friar Domenico Paganelli, who began its construction in 1604 on a 16th-century rusticated base. The tower is quadrangular, with five superimposed orders and crowned by a dome. At its base, within a niche featuring a balcony with an elegant wrought iron and brass railing, is a marble statue of the Madonna with Child by Francesco Scala, dated 1611. The original tower was destroyed by retreating German forces in November 1944. The current structure is a faithful reconstruction from 1953, retaining the original 17th-century Madonna and Child statue, which survived the collapse.

==== Main Fountain ====
The monumental fountain, situated between the Cathedral and the Clock Tower, was commissioned by Domenico Paganelli, who oversaw the construction of a city aqueduct in 1583. Work resumed in 1614, as Paganelli was occupied with other commissions in Rome. On the suggestion of Cardinal Rivarola, he entrusted the construction of a fountain, serving as the terminal point of an underground conduit from Errano, to the Ticino architect Domenico Castelli, who completed the work in 1621. The fountain, adorned with symbolic bronze sculptures by Tarquinio Jacometti in 1619–1620, is a celebrated work. The eagles and dragons represent the heraldic feats of Pope Paul V (Borghese), while the three rampant lions symbolize the city's coat of arms. The tall iron fence that once protected it was removed in 1869.

==== Voltone della Molinella ====
The Voltone della Molinella, a covered passageway with cross vaults at the ground level of Palazzo Manfredi, connects the main square, Piazza del Popolo, to Piazza Nenni, home to the municipal Masini Theatre. The umbrella vault was decorated with grotesque motifs by Marco Marchetti in 1566. Today, the Voltone houses the entrance to the tourist office and the municipal exhibition gallery.

==== Masini Theatre ====
The Angelo Masini Municipal Theatre, located in Piazza Nenni (formerly "della Molinella"), is one of the finest examples of Neoclassical architecture in Faenza. Designed and built between 1780 and 1787 by architect Giuseppe Pistocchi at the request of the Accademia dei Remoti, a group of Faenza intellectuals and artists formed in 1673, the theatre features a horseshoe-shaped layout with four tiers of boxes separated by columns of various styles. It is adorned with frescoes by Felice Giani. The upper tier is enriched with plastic decorations and twenty statues representing Olympian deities, crafted by Antonio Trentanove.

==== Prospettiva (Fontanone) ====
The Prospettiva, locally known as the "Fontanone," is a monument serving as the architectural backdrop at the end of Viale Stradone. Constructed in 1824 under the supervision of Pietro Tomba, it replaced an earlier water reservoir from the ancient aqueduct. Commissioned by the Deputation of the Public Promenade and Gonfalonier Antonio Margotti, it was designed to complete the avenue—then a popular strolling area—with a structure serving as a scenic endpoint and a place for rest and refreshment during Sunday walks outside the city gates.

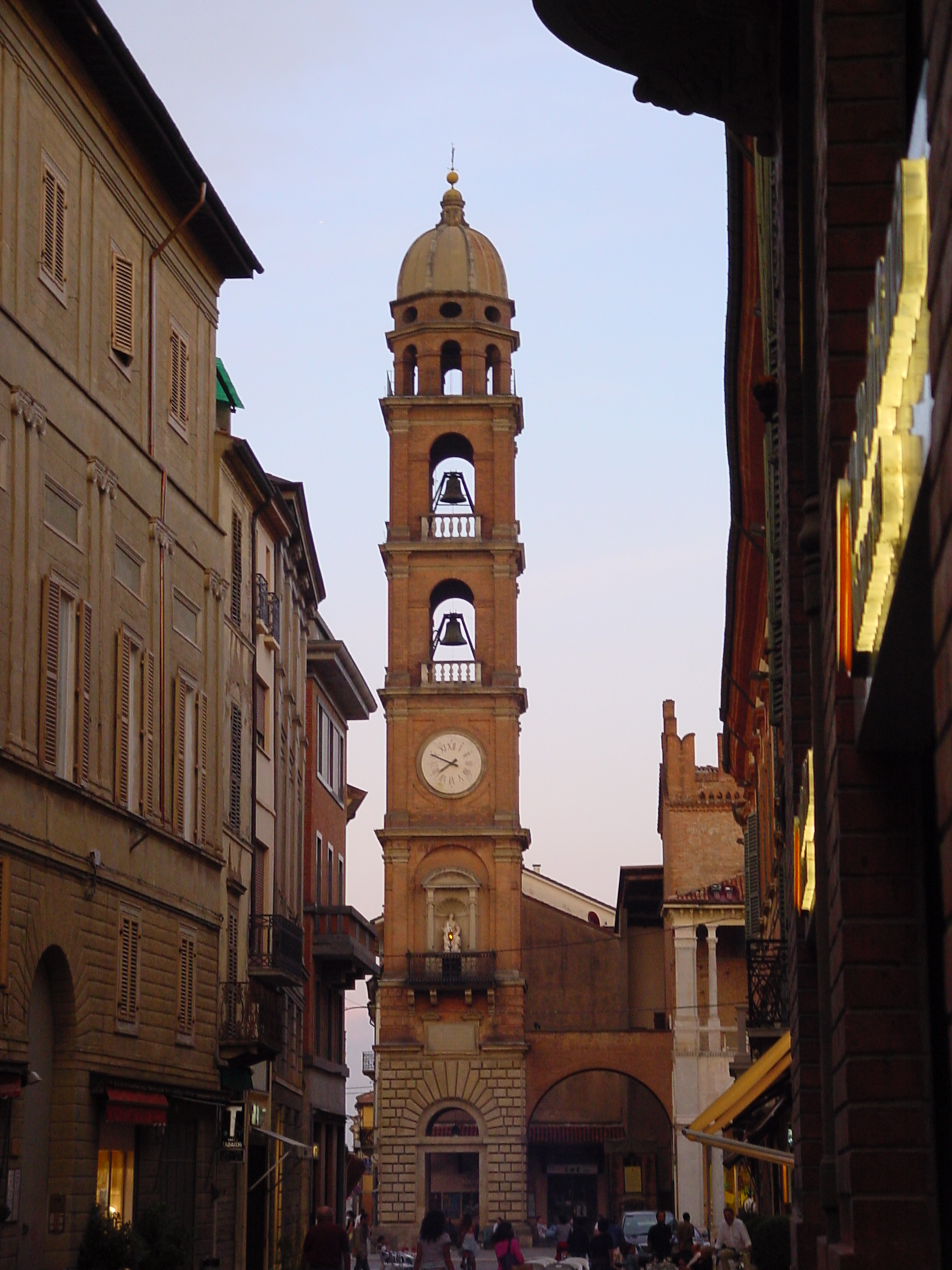
Clock Tower

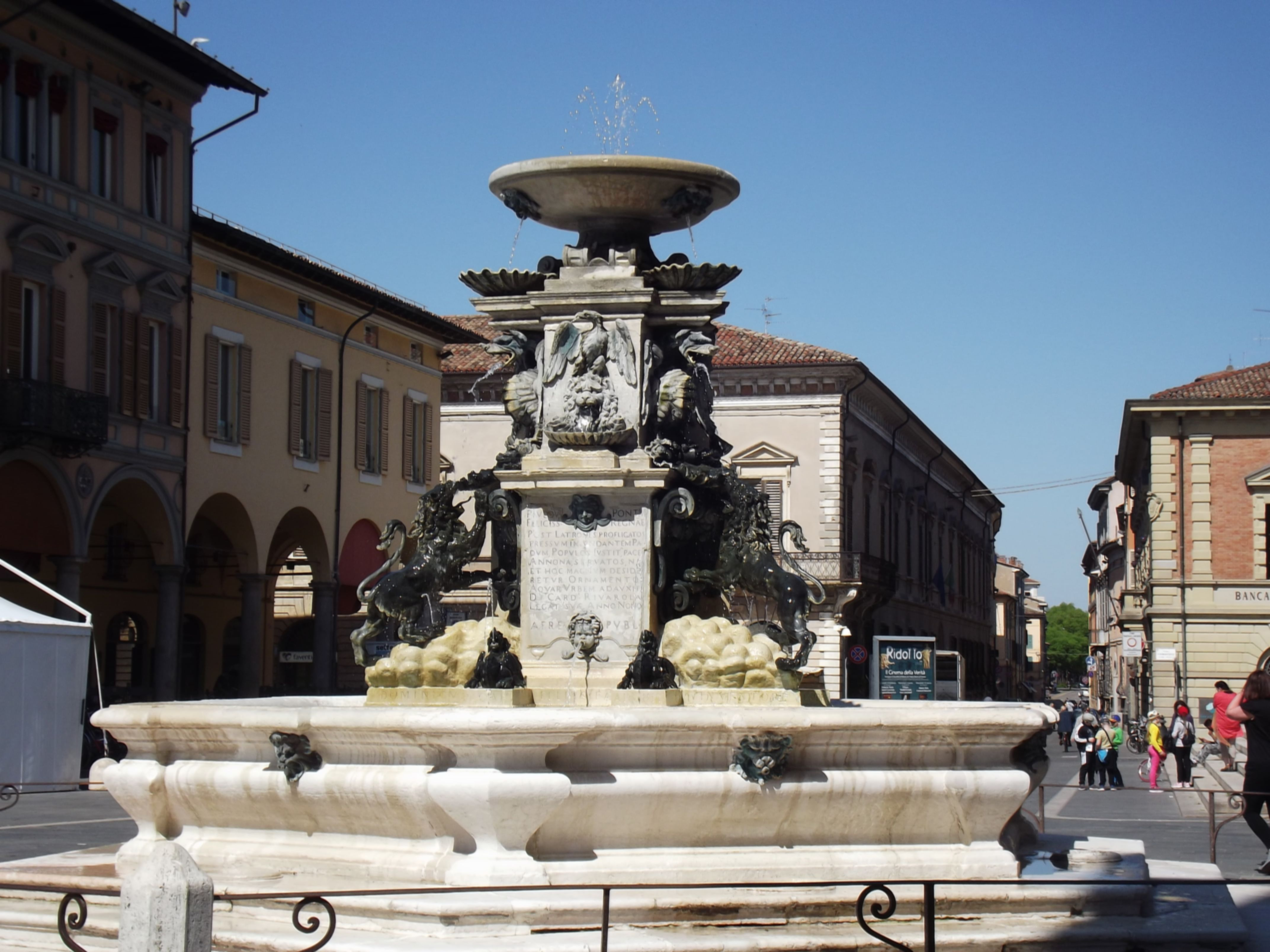
Main Fountain

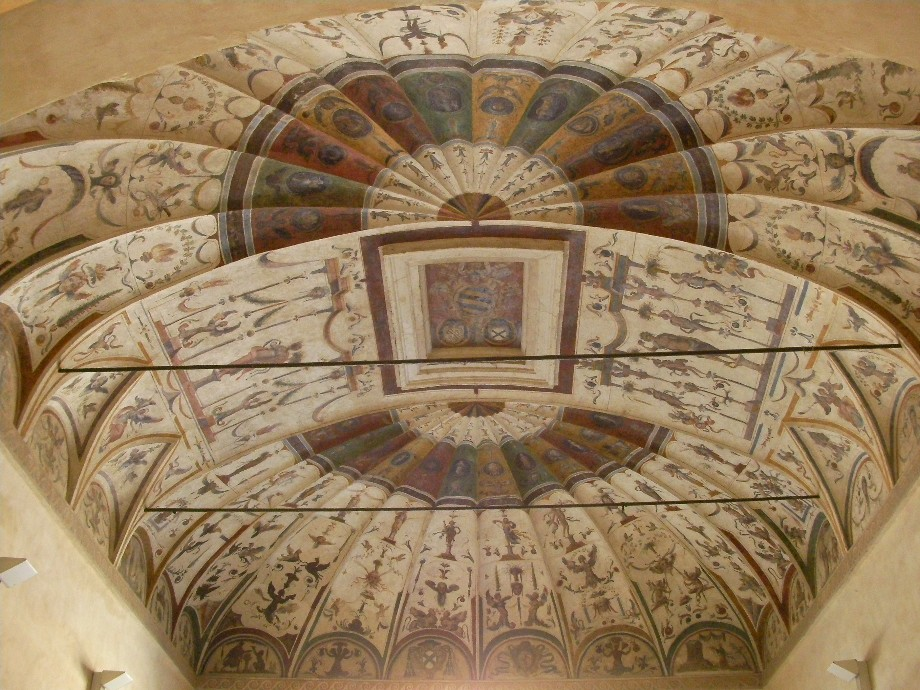
Voltone della Molinella

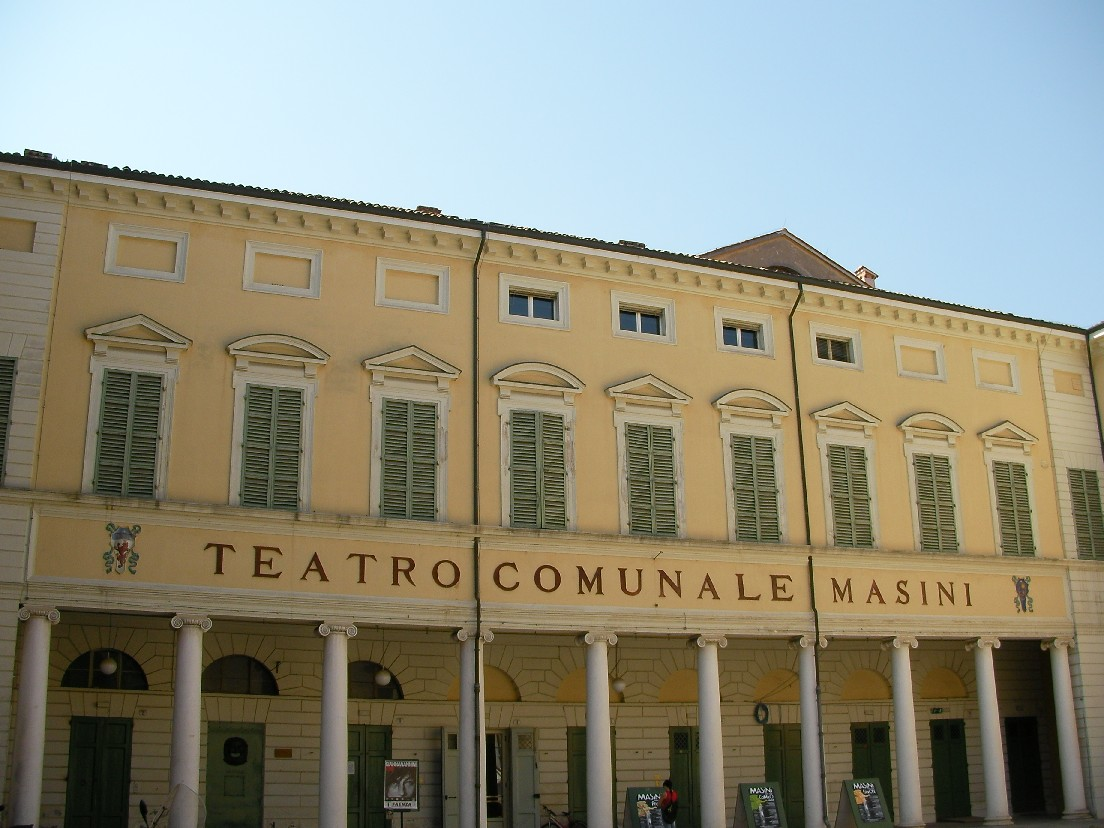
Angelo Masini Theatre

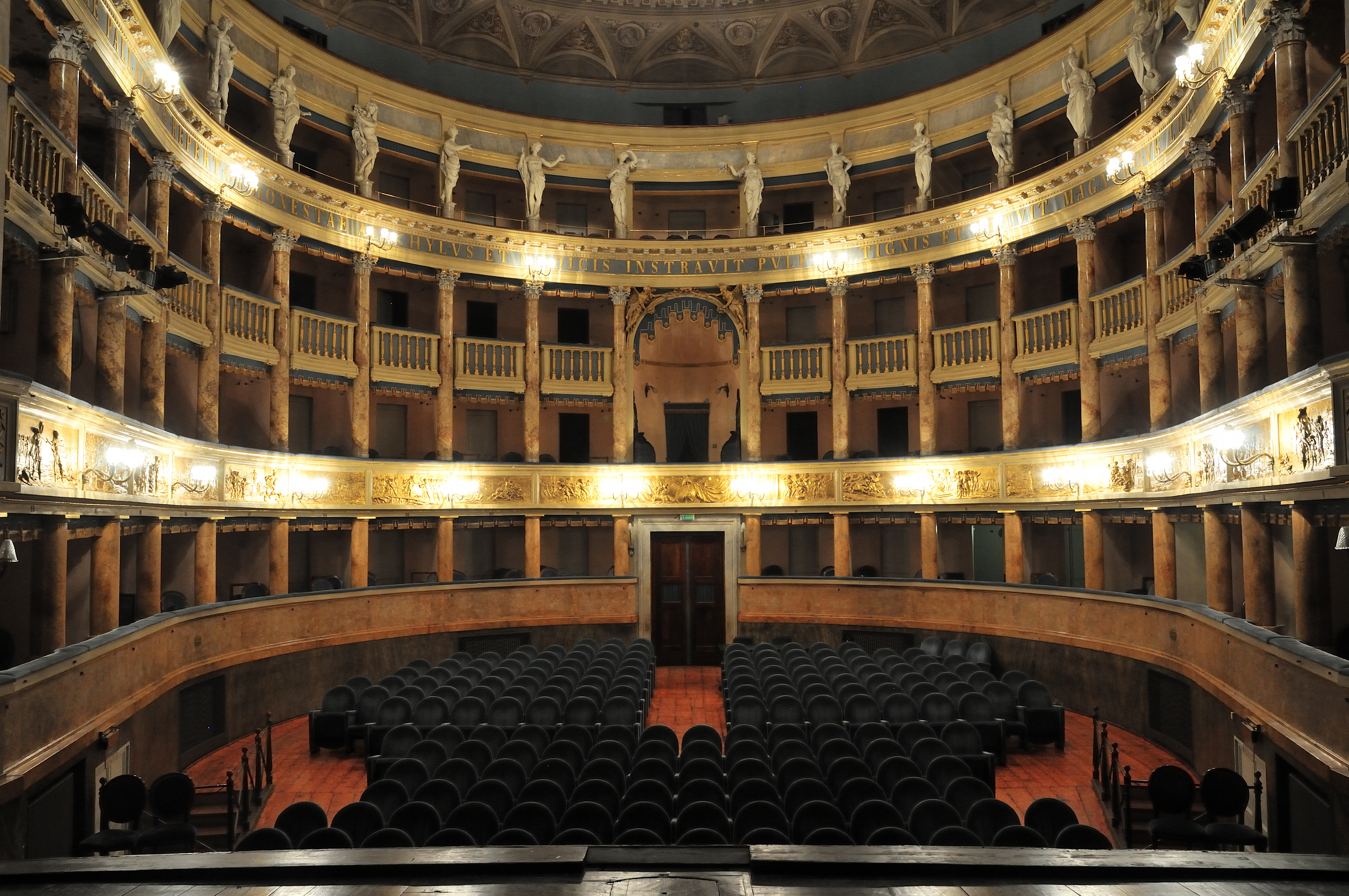
View of the stalls and boxes of the Masini Theatre

==== Palaces ====
Below is a list of palaces of significant historical and cultural interest, from the Middle Ages to the Neoclassical period, in Faenza's historic center:

- Palazzo Manfredi, in Piazza del Popolo, now the municipal seat. This ancient building underwent several structural and layout interventions over the years. The first significant one, chronologically, is attributed to Astorre I Manfredi, who in the 14th century gave the palace its initial form, later becoming the residence of his successors, including Carlo II Manfredi, who oversaw numerous renovations, including the loggia. It retains medieval traces, such as the colonnade, the hall of flags with a coffered ceiling, the entablature displaying some of the city's most prominent family crests, and a bifora.
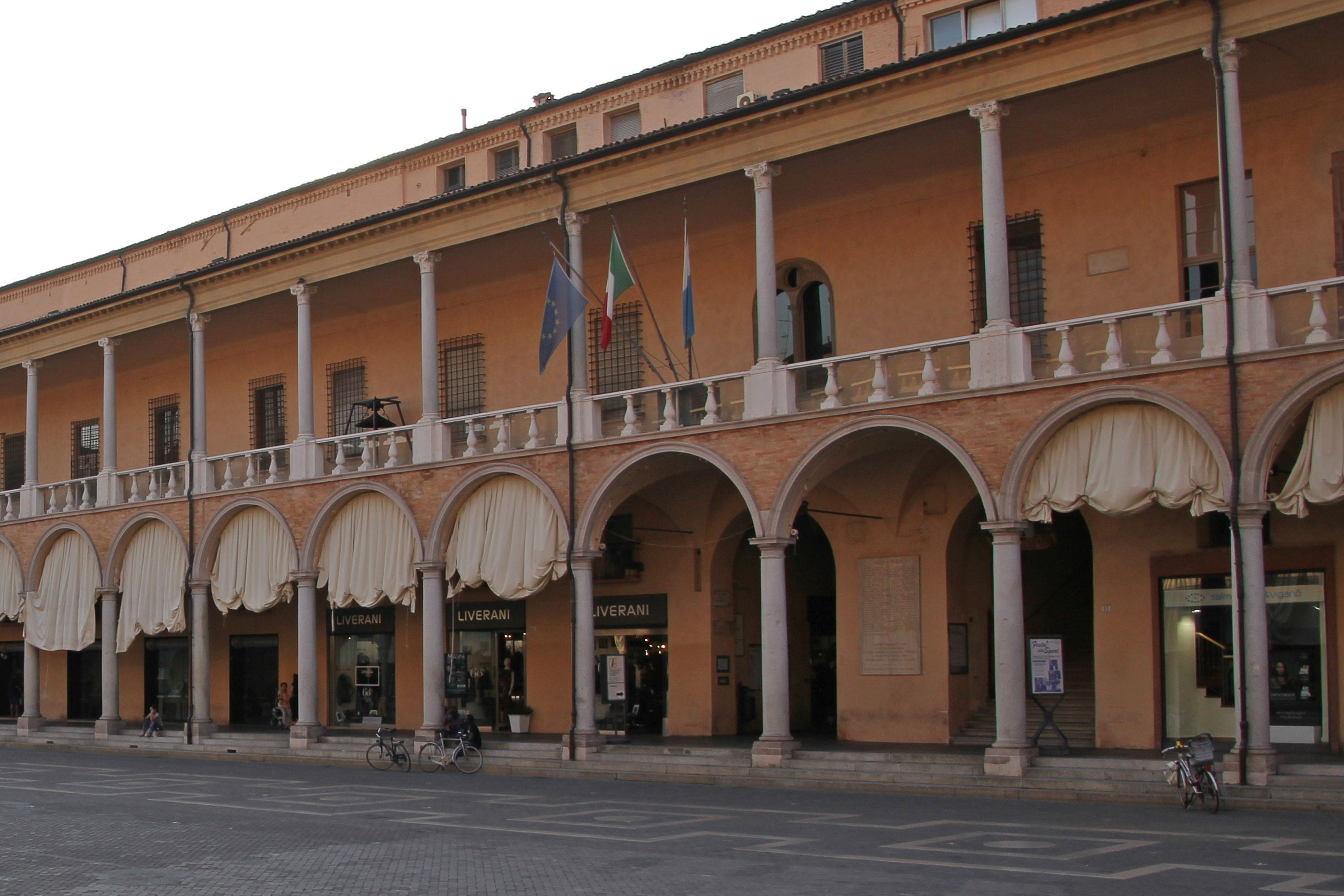
  Palazzo Manfredi, seat of the municipality
- Palazzo del Podestà, opposite the municipal palace, represented the third power alongside the Lordship (Palazzo Manfredi) and the People (the Piazza). Historical records suggest it was completed in 1175, with the staircase leading to the upper floor demolished in 1270 to make way for the balcony known as the "arengario," from which speeches were delivered to the public. The recently restored "Arengo" hall was part of a municipal redevelopment project. The Romanesque windows and Ghibelline merlons remain intact.
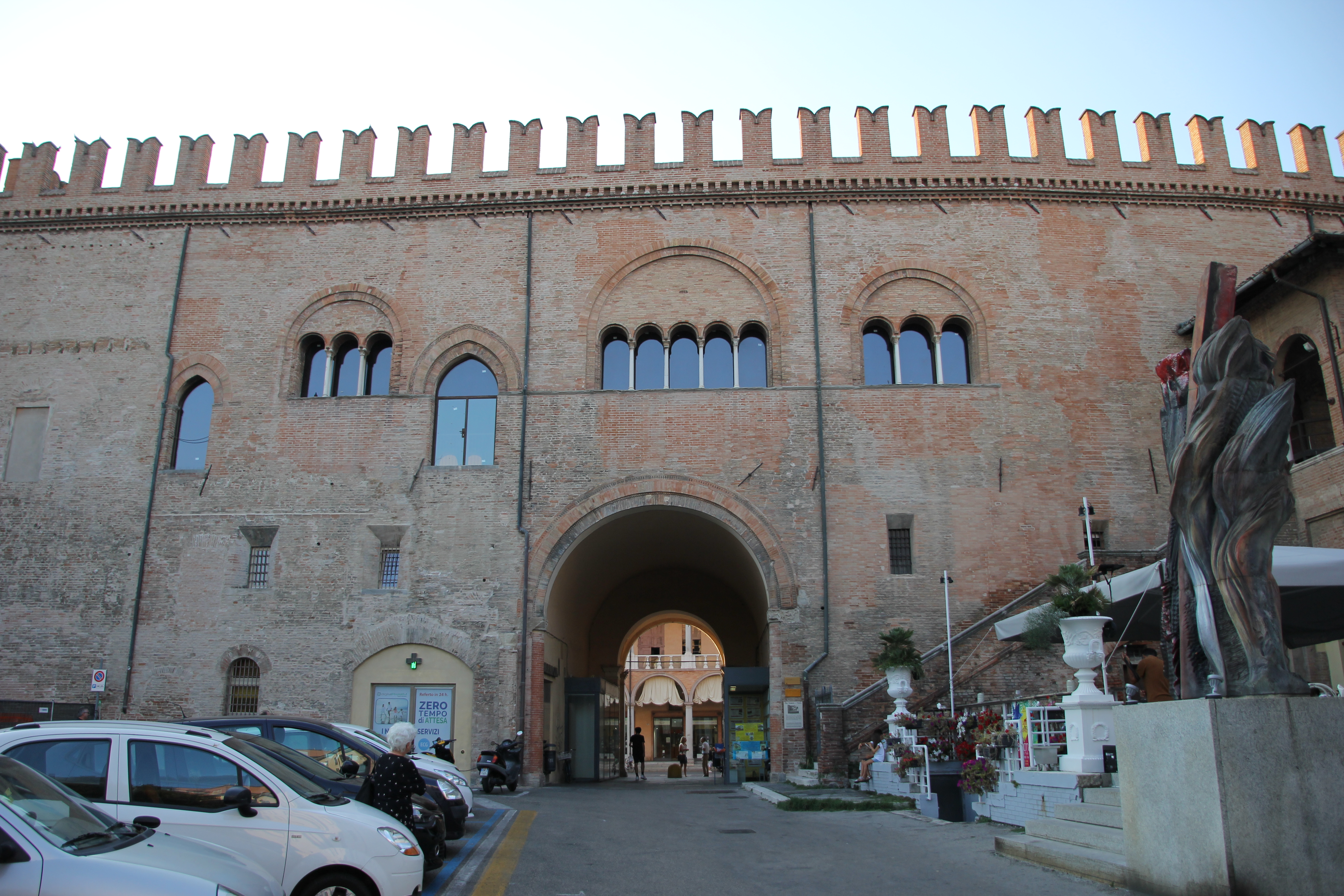
  Palazzo del Podestà
- Palazzo Milzetti, at Via Tonducci 15, the most significant Neoclassical palace in the region, featuring decorations by Felice Giani and architecture by Giuseppe Pistocchi. It now houses the National Museum of the Neoclassical Age.
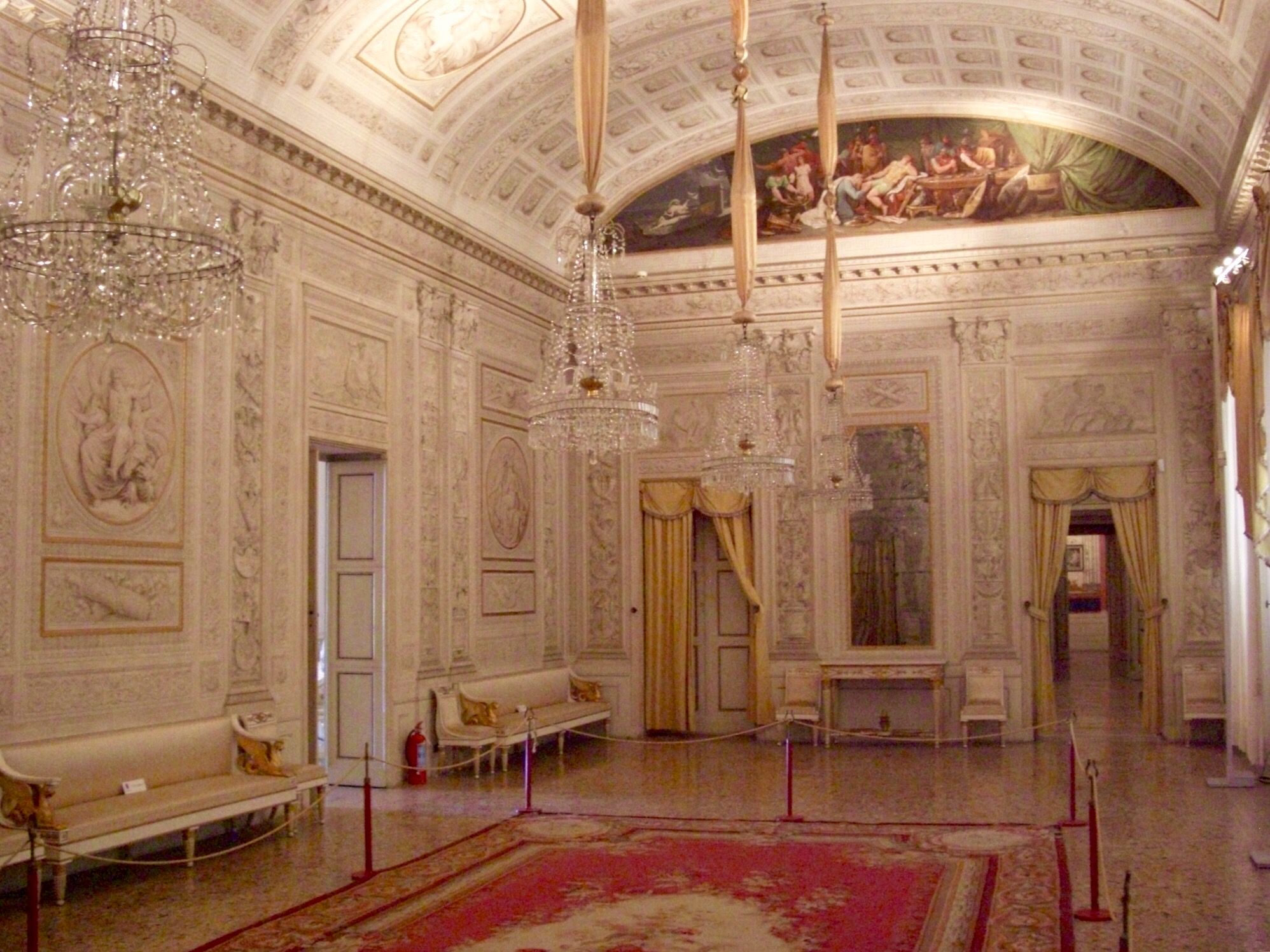
  Palazzo Milzetti
- Palazzo Mazzolani, at Corso Mazzini 93, an imposing, unfinished structure begun in the late 17th century. The right side of the facade was completed in 1933–34, demolishing pre-existing buildings. It now hosts the ISIA. The entrance hall, inner courtyard, and other spaces house state-owned archaeological material deposits.
- Palazzo Zauli-Naldi, at Corso Matteotti 2, acquired in the 17th century by a branch of the Naldi family, later passing to the Zauli Counts upon the family's extinction, hence Zauli-Naldi. It features a large portico, known as the "loggia della Pagnocca," where the family distributed bread to the poor. The right side was built in 1835 based on a design by engineer Filippo Antolini.
- Palazzo Ferniani, at Via Campidori, corner with Via Naviglio, built around the mid-18th century by the Ferniani Counts, designed by Faenza native Gian Battista Boschi, with assistance from Bolognese architect Alfonso Torreggiani. A marble statue of the Immaculate Conception, by Bolognese sculptors Ottavio and Nicola Toselli, adorns the palace's corner.
- Palazzo Severoli, on the street of the same name, built by the Severoli Counts, featuring frescoes by Felice Giani.
- Palazzo Cavina, at Via Castellani 22, built around 1740 by Raffaele Campidori for the Naldi family, acquired in the early 19th century by the Cavina Counts, who commissioned Felice Giani to decorate it.
- Palazzo Zanelli (later Pasolini Zanelli), at Corso Mazzini 52, built around 1750.
- Palazzo Caldesi, also incorrectly called "Case Manfredi," an original 15th-century building renovated by the Caldesi family in 1778, preserving some medieval and Renaissance elements. Notable features include the 14th-century Gothic arch on Via Manfredi, the coffered ceiling in the same room, the portico with brick arches in the courtyard, and the upper loggia. Of particular value are the 16th-century friezes and 19th-century paintings: four tempera works by Felice Giani dated 1820 and a later decoration by Faenza painter Clemente Caldesi.
- Palazzo Laderchi, at Corso Garibaldi 2, commissioned in 1780 by Count Ludovico Laderchi to Bolognese architect Francesco Tadolini, now home to the Museum of the Risorgimento and Contemporary Age. Notable are the decorations by Felice Giani in the "Gallery of Psyche" (1794) and the "Astronomy Study" (1797).
- Palazzo Gessi, at Corso Mazzini 54, built in 1786 by architect Giuseppe Pistocchi.
- Palazzo Conti or Conti-Sinibaldi, at Corso Mazzini 47, designed by Giuseppe Pistocchi in 1786, with a gallery decorated by Felice Giani.
- Palazzo Cattani, at Via Severoli 33, renovated in 1855 by Marquis Giuseppe Cattani based on a design by Ticino-born architect Costantino Galli.
- Palazzo Zucchini, at Corso Mazzini 85, commissioned in 1865 by Count Luigi Zucchini and designed by engineer-architect Antonio Zannoni, who reinterpreted Faenza's Neoclassical architectural models. The ground floor features six arches, with upper floors framed by large pilasters with Corinthian capitals surrounding the windows and supporting an elaborate cornice displaying family crests.
- Palazzo Gucci-Boschi, at Corso Matteotti 8–10, with an eclectic facade celebrating the Risorgimento battles of Solferino and San Martino and Volturno, designed for the Gucci Boschi Counts by engineer Achille Ubaldini in 1867.
- Palazzo Pasolini, at Via Severoli 31, corner with Via Pistocchi, modified in the late 18th century by architect Giuseppe Pistocchi, frescoed in 1818 by Felice Giani. The facade was redone in 1875.
- Casa Valenti, a 19th-century palace designed by engineer Luigi Biffi in an unusual neo-Gothic style, enriched with fine terracotta elements.
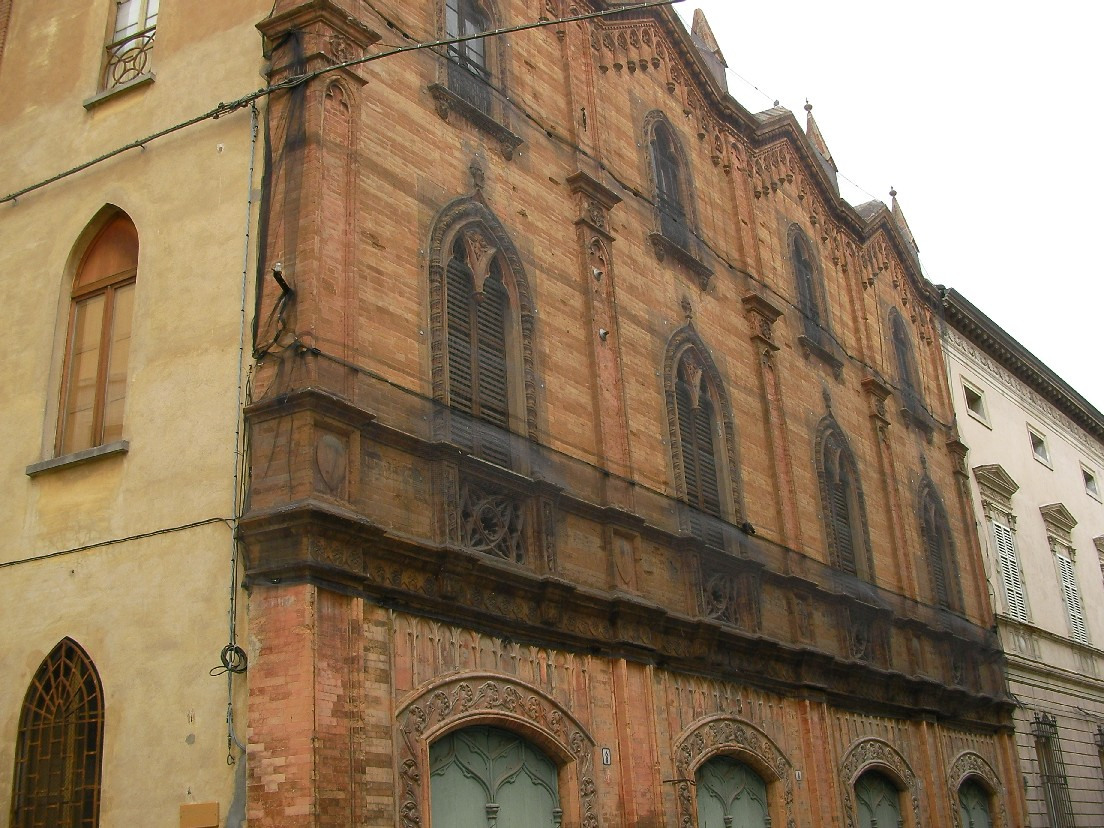
  Casa Valenti
- Casa Piani-Pasi, a palace from 1807 designed by architect Pietro Tomba.
- Casa Ricciardelli, a 17th-century building.

==== Loggias ====
The loggias and porticoes of greatest interest in the historic center are:

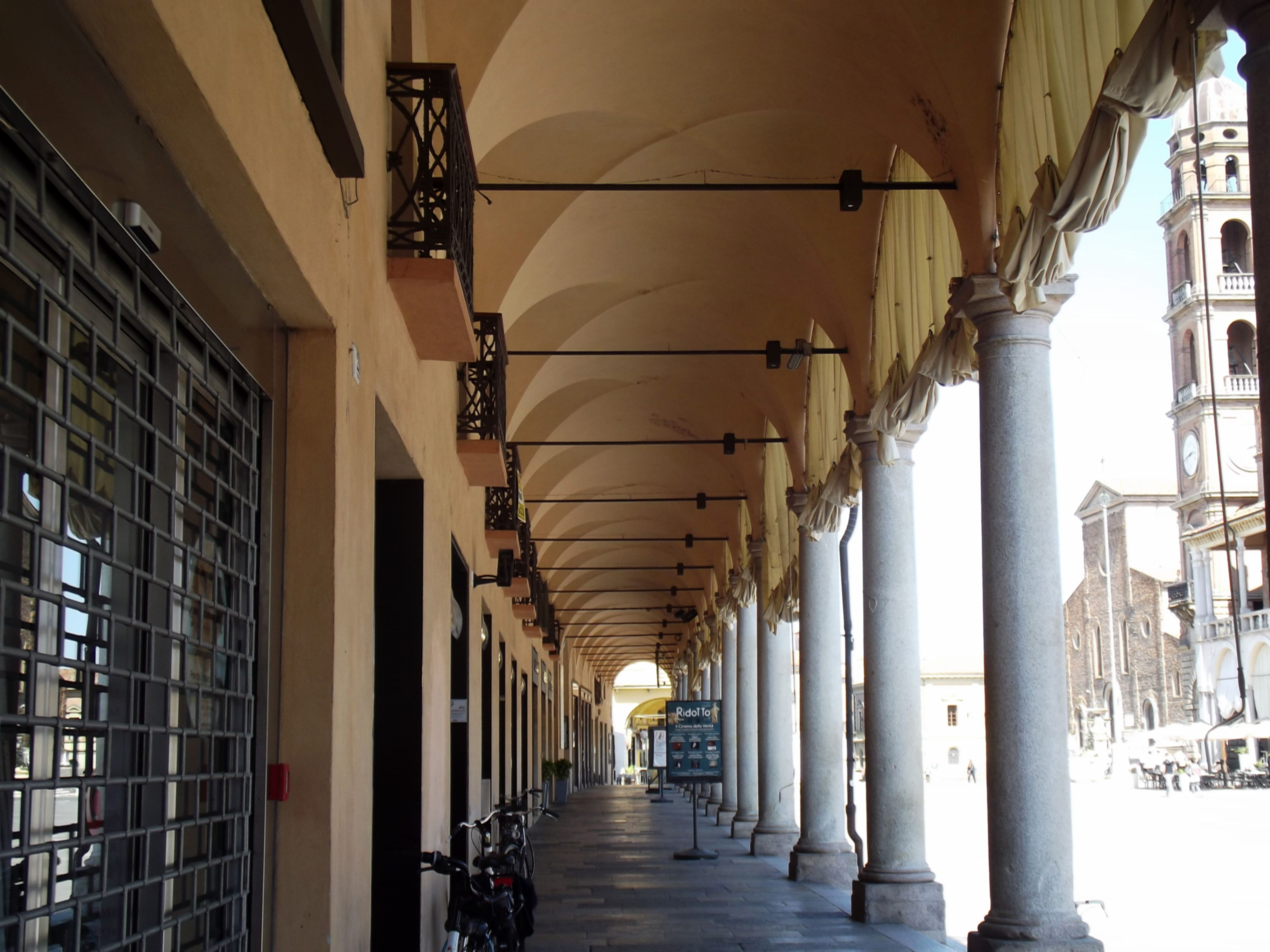
Loggia (Portico) of Palazzo Manfredi

- Loggia of the Magistrates at Palazzo Manfredi, built in 1470 by Carlo II Manfredi, later integrated and rebuilt.
- Loggia of Palazzo del Podestà, of 18th-century origin but designed to imitate Palazzo Manfredi.
- Portico of the Lords, or of the Goldsmiths, built opposite the Cathedral between 1604 and 1611. The architecture and layout, including the buildings above, have remained largely unchanged. Modern shops, bars, and bank offices now occupy the space once used by goldsmith workshops and old stores.
- Portico of the Pagnocca at Palazzo Zauli-Naldi, built by the Naldi brothers in 1629 as an ornament to the southern end of the square and to complete the then-renovated "Cremonino" Palace from the Manfredi era.

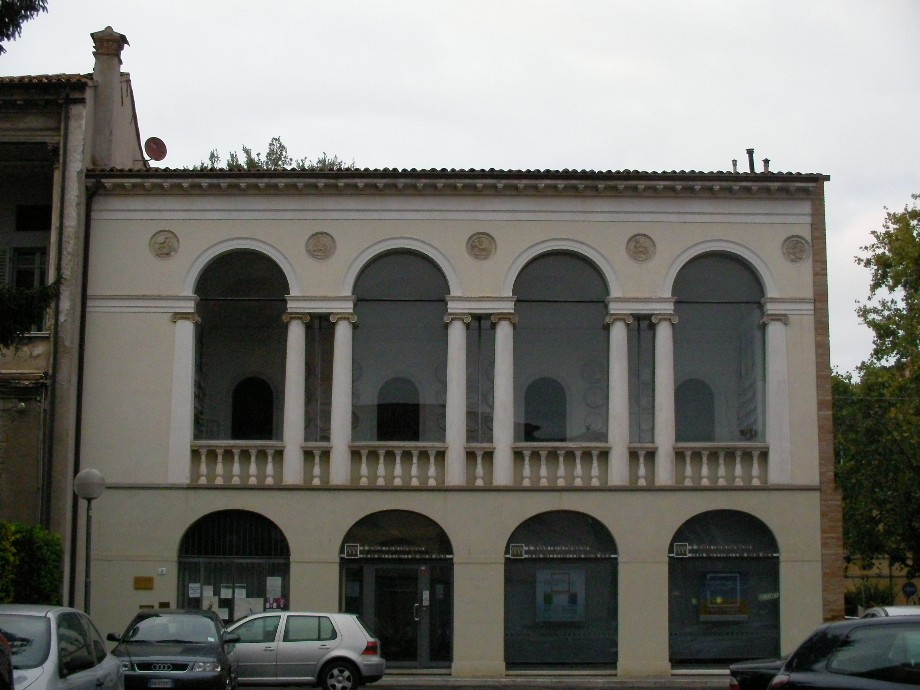
Loggia of Palazzo Bandini-Rossi (Ricciardelli)

- Loggia of Palazzo Bandini-Rossi, or Ricciardelli, in Piazza II Giugno. The original palace was renovated in 1840 by Pietro Tomba for the Ricciardelli Counts. Acquired in 1842 by the Rossi brothers of Castel Bolognese, the palace was destroyed in the 1944 bombings, leaving only the backdrop with two tiers of loggias. The upper loggia features a serliana arch popularized by Sebastiano Serlio in the 16th century, later adopted by Pietro Tomba.
- Loggia del Trentanove, named after sculptor Antonio Trentanove, who between 1775 and 1780 created four large stucco statues for the niches of the suspended portico, forming the surviving backdrop of Palazzo Bandini-Rossi. The loggia consists of ten slender Corinthian columns, similar to those inside the Masini Theatre, with four niches containing statues symbolizing the elements of water, earth, air, and fire.
- Loggia dei Fantini (Infantini), or Portico of Charity, facing Corso Mazzini, echoes the Renaissance architecture of Florence's Ospedale degli Innocenti. Originally the Great Hospital, known as the "House of God," it became the seat of charitable institutions in the 15th century, likely housing foundlings, hence the name "Fantini," meaning "Infantini."

==== Villas ====
In the hills and countryside surrounding Faenza, several historic residences were built by the nobility of Faenza between the 18th and 19th century. The main villas in the municipal territory are:

- Villa Conti, known as "delle Fabbriche," destroyed during the war, with only the two propylaea at the entrance along the Via Aemilia remaining.
- Villa Emaldi, known as "Le Tombe," built in the 15th century and modified in the 19th century by architect Modanesi, featuring a large park with a neo-Gothic greenhouse, an oratory, and a bird snare.
- Villa Ferniani, known as "Case Grandi," housing a vast collection of ceramics produced by the Ferniani manufactory.
- Villa Gessi, built in Sarna based on a design by engineer-architect Antonio Zannoni.
- Villa Laderchi, known as "Rotonda," constructed between 1798 and 1805 by Giovanni Antonio Antolini for Count Achille Laderchi, with frescoes by Romolo Liverani.
- Villa Laderchi al Prato.
- Villa Orestina, known as "Inquisitora," built by the Cattoli Counts in the 19th century.
- Villa Pasi, designed by Pietro Tomba in 1825 for the Pasi Counts.
- Villa Rossi, known as "San Prospero," the site of numerous killings by Nazi-fascists during World War II.

=== Military architecture ===
==== Walls ====
The defensive walls still partially surrounding the city, though affected by urbanization and wars, were erected during the Manfredi period between 1380 and 1470, replacing and expanding the earlier early medieval walls, with a total length exceeding 5 km, including Borgo Durbecco. They were punctuated by towers (originally 35, with 26 remaining) and five large gates, of which only Porta delle Chiavi survives. In addition to the city walls, two towers were built on a fortified bridge connecting the city to the Borgo, dismantled after a 1842 flood of the Lamone River.

==== Oriolo Tower ====
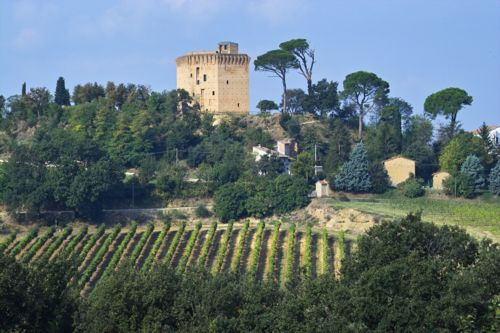
Oriolo Tower

In the hilly hamlet of Oriolo dei Fichi, southeast of the city, stands a 15th-century Manfredi keep with a hexagonal plan.

=== Other ===
==== Squares ====
Leaning against a column, he gazed at the Cathedral. The large central door was ajar, and a red cloth fluttered gently on the arch of its frame, signaling a religious feast that day; the granite staircase seemed whiter in the sunlight, the fountain gurgled from all its jets, enveloped in a mist of water as fine as vapor. The entire expanse before the Cathedral and to the end of the square remained deserted; no carriage lingered near the café, the omnibus from the grand hotel had already returned from the station; only a few bicycles passed silently through the emptiness from time to time.

— Alfredo Oriani, "Vortice", 1899

Below are the city's most significant squares:

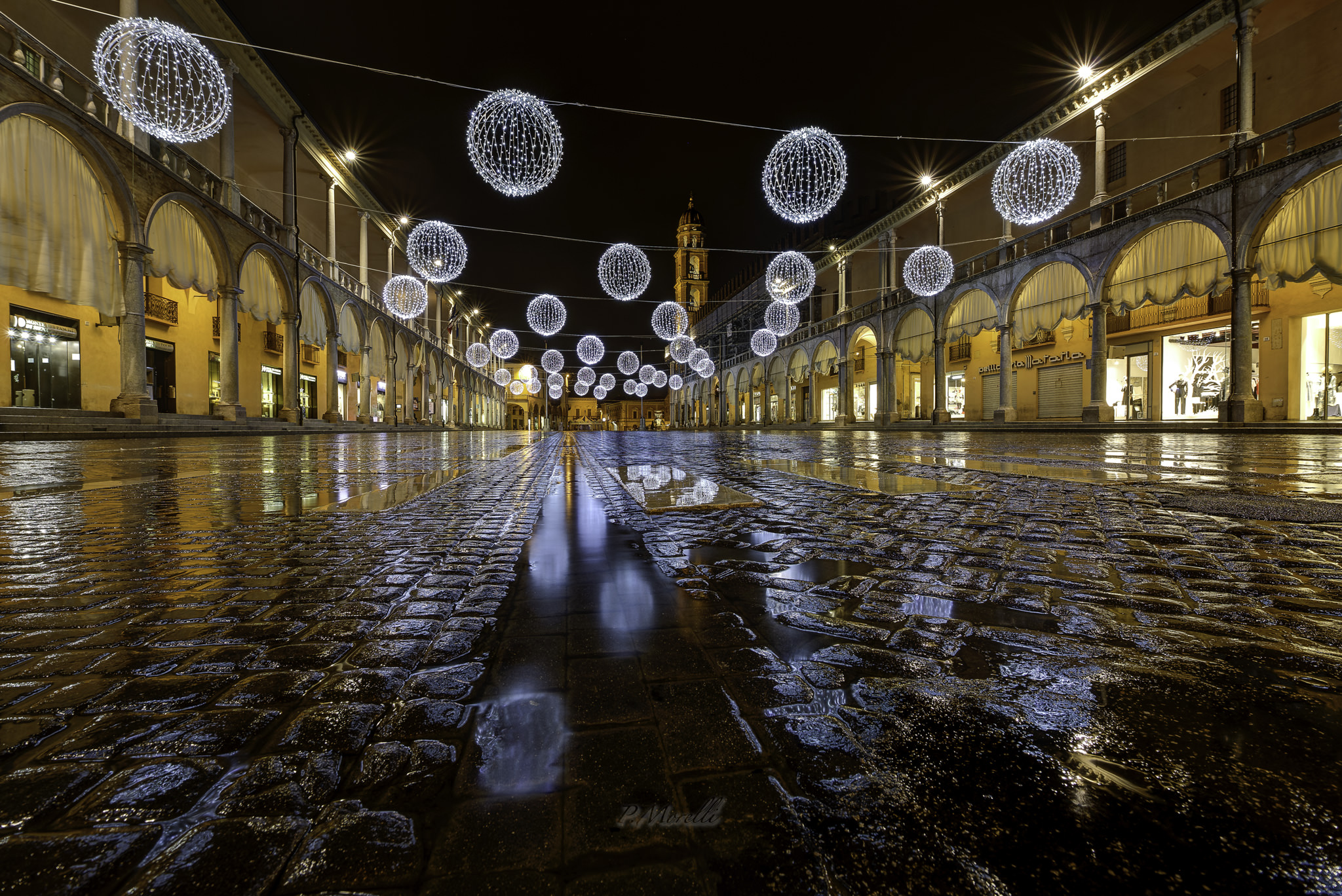
Piazza del Popolo during the Christmas season

- Piazza del Popolo: Faenza’s main square, it began taking its current form in the 15th century with the construction of the Palazzo Manfredi loggia, following the transformation of the ancient city government into a signoria and the Manfredi family's move to the municipal palace. It is home to the medieval buildings of Palazzo del Podestà and Palazzo Manfredi (now the town hall), with their porticoes defining its character.

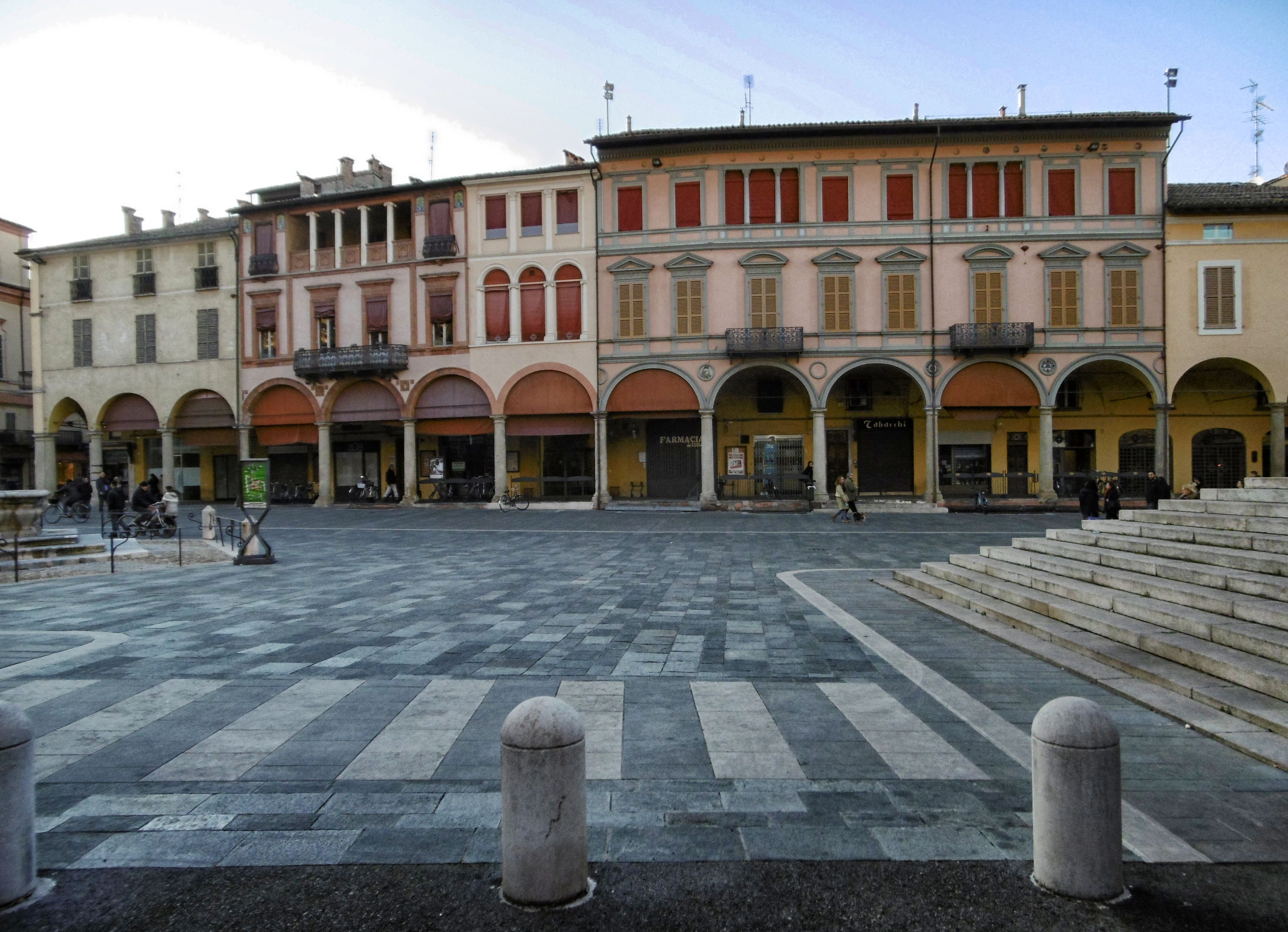
Piazza della Libertà and the Goldsmiths’ portico

- Piazza della Libertà: Adjacent to Piazza del Popolo, it is not physically separated but features distinct architectural traits. The facade of the Cathedral dominates the square, opposite the Goldsmiths’ portico and alongside the monumental Main Fountain.
- Piazza Nenni (della Molinella): Originally the inner courtyard of Palazzo Manfredi, it is accessible from Via Pistocchi or Piazza del Popolo via the Voltone della Molinella. It houses the Angelo Masini Theatre, municipal offices, and commercial establishments.
- Piazza XI Febbraio: A small area behind the Cathedral, characterized by the Old Seminary, designed by Giuseppe Boschi between 1783 and 1786, the Oratory of San Pietro in Vincoli, and the Bishop’s Palace, with 13th-century elements, now housing the Diocesan Museum.
- Piazzetta della Legna: A small open space historically used for unloading wood, shaped in its current form in the early 1930s with the construction of the then-post office, an example of Fascist-era architecture by Cesare Bazzani. In 1939, Giuseppe Casalini created a lunette on the tower's side with verses from Faenza writer Alfredo Oriani’s "Ideal Revolt."
- Piazza II Giugno: An urban void created by the demolition of Palazzo Bandini-Rossi, or Ricciardelli, destroyed in the 1944 bombings. It features the surviving backdrop of Palazzo Bandini-Rossi with the Loggia del Trentanove, Palazzo Mazzolani, and the entrance to Palazzo delle Esposizioni on Corso Mazzini.
- Piazza Martiri della Libertà: Resulting from a major demolition in 1937 of the blocks between Via Pescheria and Via Beccherie for alleged hygienic-sanitary reasons, it now serves as a parking lot and market area, the closest to the main squares. Notable are the side of Palazzo del Podestà opposite Piazza del Popolo and two contemporary ceramic works by Domenico Matteucci and Ivo Sassi.
- Piazza San Francesco: Serving as the forecourt of the namesake church and a parking area, it includes a landscaped public garden with a monument to Evangelista Torricelli.
- Piazza Rampi: Dedicated to Sister Teresa Rampi, it corresponds to the cloister of the former Santa Chiara convent. Of medieval origin, it was heavily damaged by war and post-war neglect, demolished in the 1950s. Between the 1980s and 1990s, the new post office, designed by Filippo Monti, was built along Via Naviglio, with the cloister and adjacent buildings restored, now housing the municipal registry offices. The cloister's appearance was preserved by enclosing the portico with glass to maintain visibility.
- Piazza San Domenico: A large space, once used as urban vegetable gardens, now partly a church forecourt, partly green, and partly a parking lot. Behind Palazzo Rossi, adjacent to the square, is the Rotonda Rossi, built in the former convent garden, designed by Costantino Galli in 1830 as a belvedere and icehouse.
- Piazza Fratti: Corresponding to the area in front of the demolished Porta Montanara, it features intact city walls, the sphaeristerium, and the entrance to Viale Stradone.
- Piazza Santa Lucia: Named after an ancient convent of nuns, it is an extension of Corso Matteotti at the junction with Via Castellani and Via Minardi, distinguished by the facade of Palazzo Tassinari and the small Church of Santa Margherita.
- Piazza Fra Saba da Castiglione: A lateral open space along Corso Europa in Borgo Durbecco, now used as a parking lot and forecourt for the Church of the Commenda.
- Piazza Santa Maria Foris Portam: The forecourt of the current Santa Maria Vecchia church and its adjacent space.
- Piazza Sant’Agostino: The forecourt of the Sant’Agostino church.
- Piazza Penna: The former forecourt of the suppressed Church of San Giacomo della Penna.
- Piazza San Rocco: The forecourt of the namesake church.

==== Borgo Durbecco ====
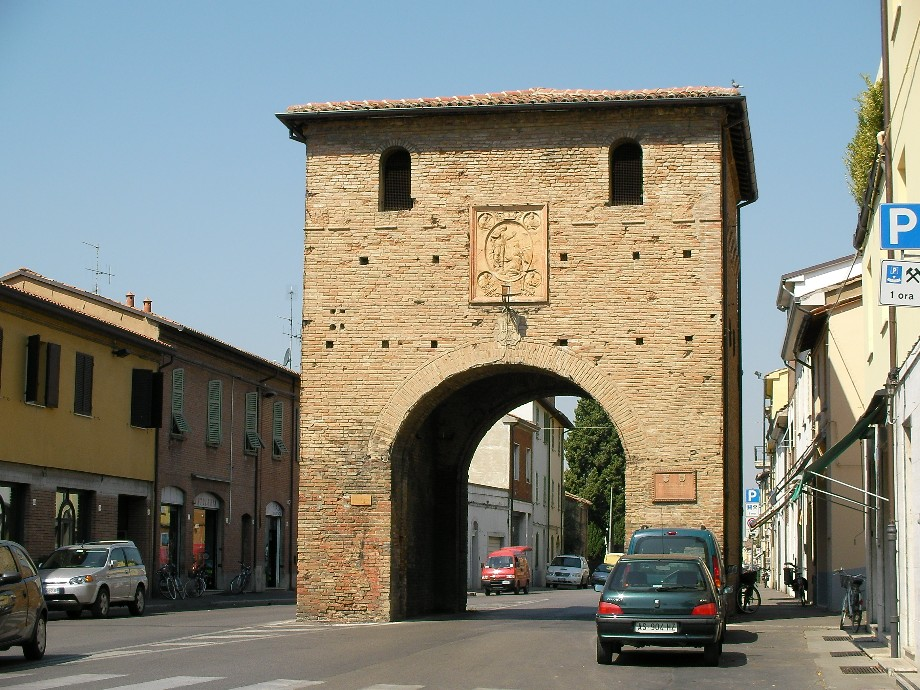
Porta delle Chiavi

The Borgo, an external expansion of Faenza, lies east of the city walls, across the Lamone River. The first settlements date to the 11th century. Key monuments include the Church of the Santissima Annunziata, the Church of Sant’Antonino, the Church of the Commenda, and the 16th-century Porta delle Chiavi, the only surviving city gate, named after the donation of the city keys to Pope Pius IX in 1857.

=== Archaeological sites ===
Traces of Roman Faenza are no longer directly visible due to subsequent urban development. However, artifacts from archaeological excavations have been recovered, cataloged, and collected. The tour of the sites and artifacts is managed by the Museum Service of the Union of Faenza Romagna.

==== Archaeological exhibition at Palazzo Mazzolani ====
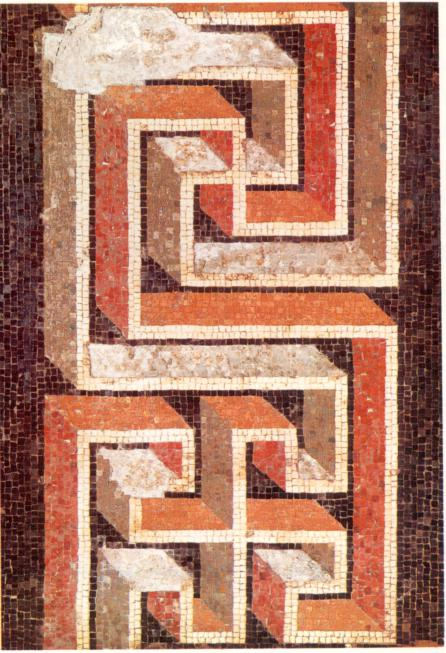
One of the mosaic floors displayed in the archaeological collection

In the courtyard of Palazzo Mazzolani, a selection of the most significant floors uncovered during archaeological excavations of Roman Faenza has been displayed. The chronological range of these mosaics spans from the 1st to the 6th century AD. In Roman Faventia, large domus featured highly refined mosaics. The collection of materials preserved at Palazzo Mazzolani is remarkably significant, covering a vast timeline from prehistory to late antiquity.

=== Natural areas ===
==== Parks and gardens ====
Faenza is a green city, with numerous public parks and gardens, some located in the historic center. The Bucci Park, spanning over 8 hectares, features paths, hills, ponds, and streams, and is home to numerous plant and animal species that roam freely throughout the park.

== Society ==
Demographic evolution of Faenza
Year	Pop.	±%
1861	36,111	—
1871	36,385	+0.8%
1881	36,104	−0.8%
1901	39,750	+10.1%
1911	39,900	+0.4%
1921	42,145	+5.6%
1931	46,503	+10.3%
1936	47,189	+1.5%
1951	48,043	+1.8%
1961	51,076	+6.3%
1971	54,694	+7.1%
1981	55,158	+0.8%
1991	54,139	−1.8%
2001	53,641	−0.9%
2011	57,748	+7.7%
2021	58,899	+2.0%

=== Ethnic groups and foreign minorities ===
As of 31 December 2023, foreign residents in the municipality totaled 6,483, or 12.68% of the population.

The most significant groups are:

1. Albania, 1,012
2. Romania, 998
3. Morocco, 969
4. Moldova, 826
5. Senegal, 508
6. Ukraine, 346
7. China, 222
8. Poland, 208
9. Nigeria, 160
10. Tunisia, 129

=== Languages and dialects ===
Faenza is deeply tied to its Romagnol cultural roots, particularly its dialect. Alongside Forlì, it is renowned as a center of the Romagnol dialect typical of central-western Romagna, though notable differences exist between the two centers. Even between hamlets a few kilometers apart, variations in terms and accents can be observed. The dialect tends to lose certain peculiarities as one moves away from the central core.

The Filodrammatica "A. P. Berton," one of Italy's first amateur theater companies founded in 1883, is based in Faenza. It is highly active in theatrical productions, particularly renowned for comedies in the Romagnol dialect. Since 1994, it has had a permanent venue: the Filodrammatici Theatre.

=== Religion ===
Faenza is the seat of the Diocese of Faenza-Modigliana of the Catholic Church.

The patroness of Faenza and its diocese is the Blessed Virgin of Graces. Devotion to the patroness stems from an apparition of the Virgin, invoked by a devotee named Giovanna during the plague of 1412. In iconography, the Madonna is depicted with arms raised, holding six broken arrows, symbolizing the plague's end through her intercession. The sacred image was painted as an ex-voto on a wall (in muro sub pontile) of the Church of San Domenico. On 12 May 1420, a chapel dedicated to the Virgin was consecrated within the church. Since then, the second Sunday of May has been the Feast of Our Lady of Graces, now observed on the preceding Saturday. In 1631, during another plague outbreak, the image was crowned.
Since 1762, Our Lady of Graces has been venerated in the Cathedral, in a marble altar beside the presbytery. In April 1781, an earthquake swarm struck Faenza. The first strong quake was felt on the evening of 4 April, followed by others. The people of Faenza offered the city keys to the Virgin in a symbolic act of submission. All subsequent tremors were less intense, leading the municipality to establish 4 April as a feast day on 20 May 1781. The city chose the Virgin of Graces as its patroness.
On 25 March 1931, her designation as the primary patroness of the city and diocese was approved by Pope Pius XI, who ordered her re-crowning in his name. In 1985, the Madonna's chapel was declared a diocesan sanctuary by Bishop Francesco Tarcisio Bertozzi.

=== Traditions and folklore ===
==== Palio del Niballo ====
On the fourth Sunday of June, the Palio del Niballo, a historic reenactment and a source of pride for the city, takes place. Initiated in 1959, it draws inspiration from Faenza's medieval jousts, featuring a competition among the five city districts. The event is preceded by the Bigorda and flag-throwing and musicians’ competitions in the weeks leading up to it. The Manfredi event is part of the FIGS (Italian Federation of Historical Games). Faenza has produced many champions, both flag-throwers and knights, who have competed nationally.

Over the years, additional events have complemented the main Palio competition, designating June as the "Palio Month." Notable events include:

- Bigorda d’Oro Tournament: Also known as the "Youth Palio," similar to the main Palio but featuring younger knights, held on the Saturday before the second Sunday of June.
- Flag-Throwers’ Tournament: On the evening of the third Saturday of June, in Piazza del Popolo, the five city districts compete in various flag-throwing events.
- Nott de Bisò: On the evening of 5 January, the "Nott de Bisò," organized by the Palio Committee, attracts hundreds of visitors. At 7:00 pm, a large puppet representing the Carthaginian general Hannibal (the "Niballo"), Rome's fierce enemy whom the Faentines fought alongside during the Second Punic War, is set up in the square's center. For the occasion, the Niballo is dressed in the colors of the district that won the previous year's Palio. At midnight, it is set ablaze. The direction in which the Niballo's head falls indicates the district favored to win the upcoming Palio. The districts are protagonists of this spectacular night, serving their unique "Bisò" (the local name for mulled wine, each with a distinct recipe) and feeding the crowd with well-seasoned polenta. The first edition took place on 31 December 1964; since 1969, it has been held on 5 January.

==== Lòm a Mêrz ====
Between the last weekend of February and the first of March, the traditional "March fires" are reenacted, a hallmark of Romagnol folklore, where dry branches and pruning remnants were burned to augur a prosperous year for fields and crops.

== Culture ==
=== Archives and libraries ===
==== Manfrediana Municipal Library ====
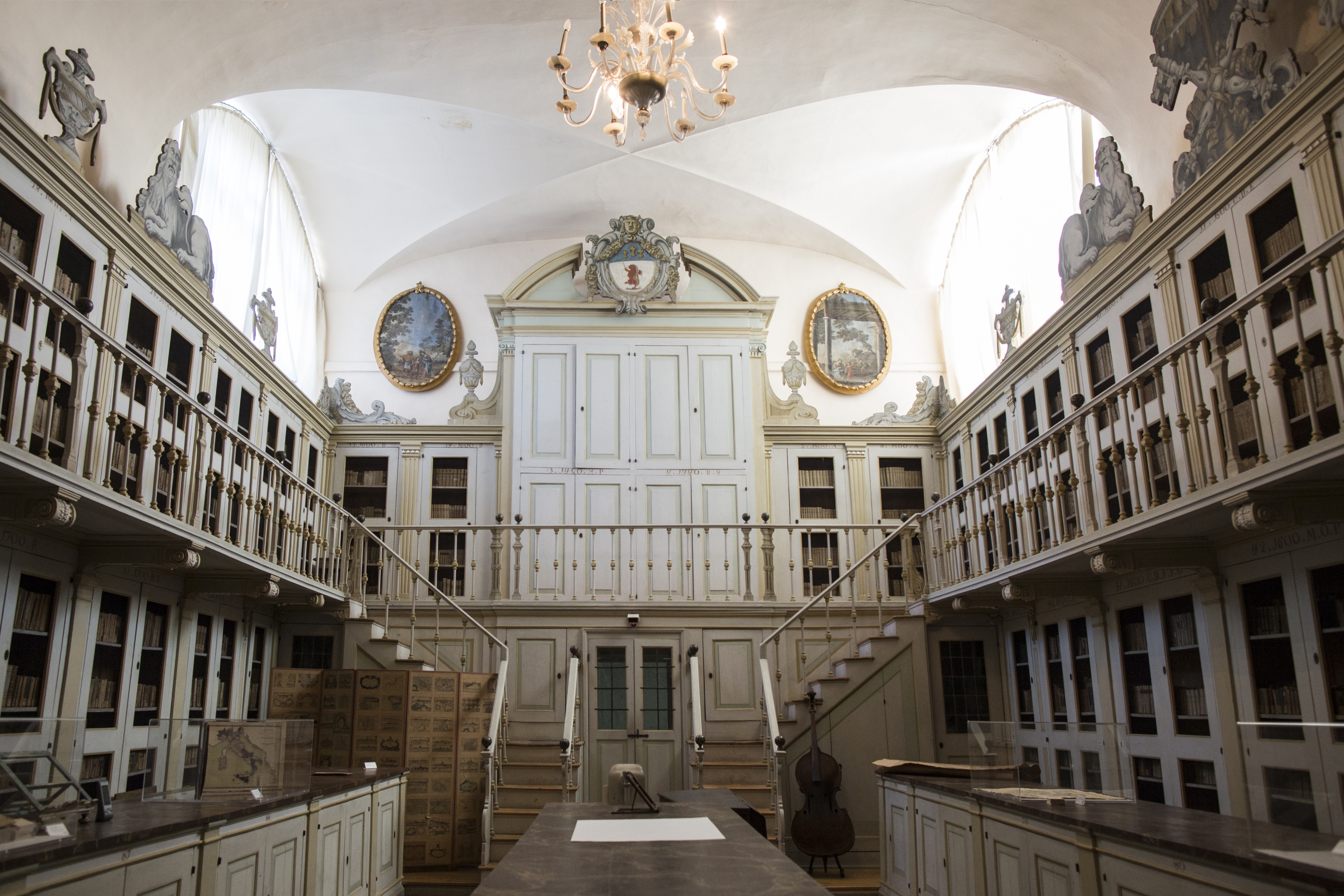
Manfrediana Library – 18th-Century Room

The Manfrediana Municipal Library is housed in the former Servi di Maria convent, adjacent to the namesake church, deconsecrated in 1954. The initial collection dates to the Napoleonic suppressions of religious associations (1797). In 1804, Abbot Zannoni, appointed librarian for life, enriched the library with his personal collection: editions of Greek and Latin classics, antiquarian works, and valuable texts. After the Napoleonic era, the library officially opened to the public on 25 November 1818. The Great Hall is on the first floor, alongside the most architecturally significant room: the "18th-Century Room," with lacquered shelves built in 1784. It served as the city’s notarial archive until 1923, when the records were relocated. The library holds numerous collections, including the Zauli Naldi Counts’ collection, gathered by Monsignor Domenico Zauli, the philosophical collection donated by Monsignor Vincenzo Poletti, the collection donated by Monsignor Carlo Mazzotti, drawings by Romolo Liverani and Domenico Rambelli, the drawings of Giuseppe Pistocchi, Italy's largest collection of Liberty-era matchboxes (approximately 35,000 pieces), and the Codex 117 (Bonadies), a 15th-century musical manuscript. According to a medieval legend, a basilisk lurks in the well in the courtyard.

==== Faenza Archival Hub ====
The Faenza Archival Hub, a section of the Ravenna State Archive, preserves millions of documents chronicling the region's history from the Early Middle Ages to the present.

==== Manfrediana Photo Archive ====
The Manfrediana Photo Archive holds a collection of approximately ten thousand historical images of Faenza. Since 2010, it has been managed by the non-profit association Fototeca Manfrediana A.P.S. – E.T.S. The archive focuses on collecting and preserving photographic material about the city and its surroundings, documenting social, urban, and cultural changes since 1860. The association promotes photography in the Faenza area and organizes exhibitions and competitions. The archive's photographs are accessible through a web portal.

=== Research ===
==== Torricelli Science and Technology Park ====
The Torricelli Science and Technology Park Faventia is an international hub for the development, research, and innovation of materials (particularly ceramic materials, composite materials, inorganic, hybrid, polymeric materials, bulk, porous materials, laminar, multifunctional, nanostructured), energy conversion efficiency, energy transition, circular economy, and environmental sustainability.

It is home to the Ravenna and Faenza Technology Park, part of the Emilia-Romagna High Technology Network. The park includes expertise in technologies, processes, and material characterization techniques aimed at innovation and industrialization, with an emphasis on eco-design and a circular economy approach. It also features a laboratory for mechanical and ICT prototyping, research and training laboratories, and an incubator for startups.

In late 2022, the C-Hub was formally established, a coordinating body among institutions, businesses, and research laboratories to promote research expertise and professionalism in innovative, composite, and ceramic materials at national and international levels.

=== Schools ===
Within the municipal area, there are nine primary schools and seven lower secondary schools. Among the Upper secondary schools and vocational institutes, notable institutions include:

- Torricelli-Ballardini High School
- "Luigi Bucci" State Technical and Vocational Institute
- "Alfredo Oriani" State Technical Institute
- "Persolino-Strocchi" State Vocational Institute
- "S. Umiltà" Private Lyceum
- "Ugo Foscolo" Private Vocational Institute

=== Universities ===
Faenza has four universities or equivalent institutions.

The Higher Institute for Artistic Industries (ISIA) in Faenza is one of only four such institutes in Italy. It is a state institution of higher education focused on research and experimentation in the field of industrial design. ISIA is part of the AFAM sector, under the supervision of the Ministry of Education, Universities, and Research.

Additionally, several branches of the University of Bologna, Ravenna Campus, are present:

- Department of Industrial chemistry "Toso Montanari", offering a degree program in Chemistry and Technologies for the Environment and Materials and a first-level Master's in Composite materials
- Faculty of Agriculture, located in Tebano, offering a degree program in Viticulture and Oenology
- Faculty of Medicine and Surgery, offering degree programs in Nursing and Speech therapy

== Museums ==
Faenza boasts a rich historical and cultural archive through its museums and art galleries.

=== International Museum of Ceramics (MIC) ===
International Museum of Ceramics in Faenza
Expression of ceramic art in the world

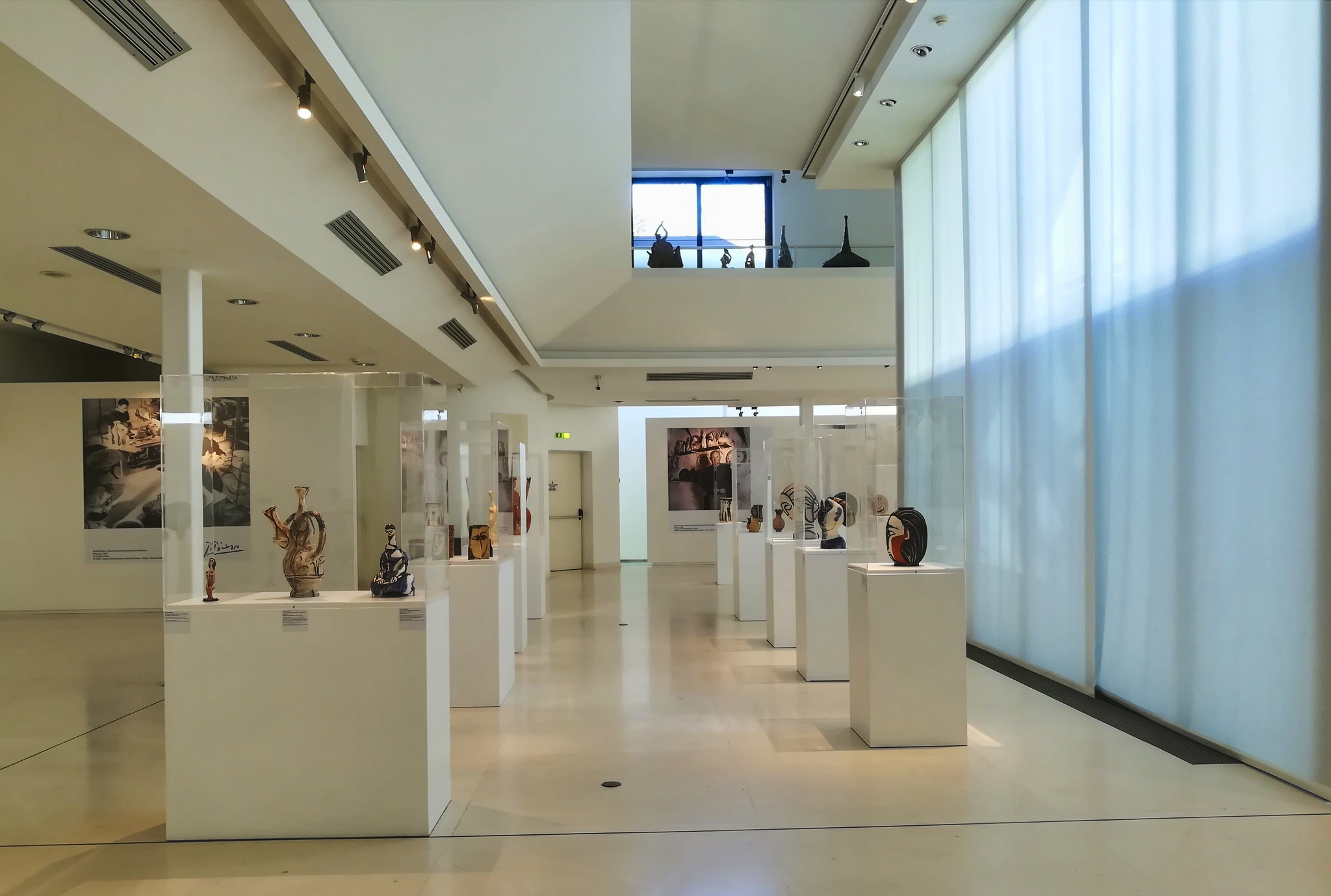
Museum section

The MIC, due to its international significance, exhibitions, conferences, and events, has been recognized by the Forlì UNESCO Club with the title of "Expression of ceramic art in the world" and included among the "Monuments testifying to a culture of peace" under the organization's program launched in 2000, the Year for the Culture of Peace.

Founded in 1908 by Gaetano Ballardini, who eight years later established the Gaetano Ballardini State Institute of Ceramic Art, now named after him. Tito Pasqui, a native of Forlì, was among the figures on the committee established by Ballardini to support the museum's creation.

The museum has become a significant cultural center for research and documentation of ceramics worldwide, offering the public a comprehensive collection of works from classical antiquity to the modern era. The journey begins with Pre-Columbian ceramics, presented with refined educational support, followed by those from classical antiquity, from prehistory to the Roman era, and then artifacts from the Far East (China, Japan, Korea) and the Middle East. On the upper floor of the old quadrangle, the evolution of Faenza ceramics from the Late Middle Ages to the Renaissance is displayed, which can be compared with the production of the Italian Renaissance, organized by region.

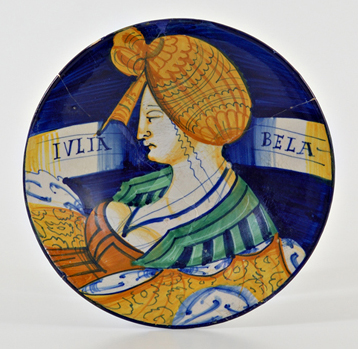
Late 15th-century plate "Giulia Bella"

One section illustrates the subsequent developments of Italian ceramics from the 17th century to the 19th century, where the eighteenth-century Faenza ceramics from the Conti Ferniani manufactory can be admired, while the Europe Room showcases a selection of products from the main European manufactories. Of notable interest is the Zucchini Nativity Scene, displayed in a dedicated room, a rare example of a monumental nineteenth-century Faenza nativity scene created for the Conti Zucchini family by the set designer Romolo Liverani. The museum is not only focused on ceramics of the past but also pays attention to contemporary production. Thus, extensive spaces are dedicated to the contemporary era, starting with works from the Premio Faenza, an international competition held since 1938. The section includes, in addition to a selection of designers, masterpieces by universally recognized artists such as Picasso, Matisse, Georges Rouault, Fernand Léger, Chagall, Salvatore Fancello, Lucio Fontana, Leoncillo, Alberto Burri, Arturo Martini, Fausto Melotti, Ugo Nespolo, Enrico Baj, Arman, and Roberto Matta. Finally, in the new conference room, visitors can access a multimedia presentation on the museum's origins.

In 2011, the Forlì UNESCO Club recognized the MIC as the "Expression of Ceramic Art in the World."

=== National Museum of the Neoclassical Age in Romagna ===
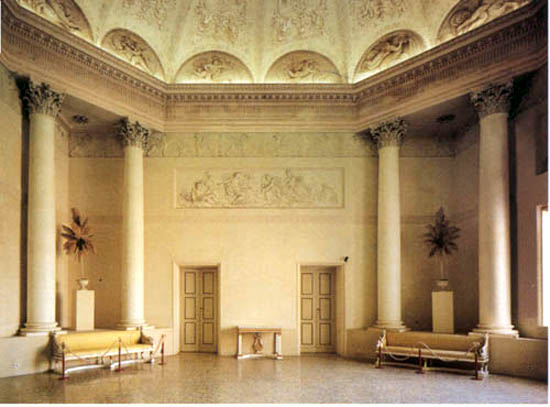
Entrance to Palazzo Milzetti

During the neoclassical era, architects such as Giuseppe Pistocchi, Giovanni Antonio Antolini, Pietro Tomba, and artists such as Felice Giani and his followers, the sculptor Antonio Trentanove, and Giovan Battista Ballanti Graziani, were instrumental in a profound cultural transformation of the city. Palazzo Milzetti (later Rondinini) represents the pinnacle of Faenza's neoclassicism, due to the extraordinary integration of architecture, decoration, and furnishings, allowing visitors to experience the lifestyle of Faenza's nobility at the beginning of the 19th century. The palace was purchased by the Italian State in 1973 and opened to the public in 1979, after a long and meticulous restoration.

=== Art Gallery ===
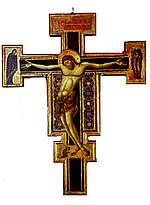
Wooden crucifix by the Master of the Franciscan Crucifixes (13th century) preserved in the municipal art gallery

The Faenza Municipal Art Gallery was established in 1797, when the municipal administration acquired an important collection of prints, drawings, plaster casts, and paintings from the artist Giuseppe Zauli, to which other artworks were soon added, coming from suppressed convents and churches due to Napoleonic laws. It was opened to the public in 1879, in the former Jesuit convent, later called Palazzo degli Studi and the seat of the Evangelista Torricelli State High School. Since then, and up to the present day, the artistic heritage has been significantly expanded through generous private donations, deposits from public entities, and archaeological finds uncovered during construction activities. Among the most important works on display: Madonna with Child and St. John in terracotta by Alfonso Lombardi; Madonna with Child and Saints Michael and Andrew by Palmezzano; St. Jerome by Donatello (one of the artist's few wooden statues), St. John the Baptist by Benedetto da Maiano, Madonna with Child, Angels, and Saints Dominic, Andrew, John the Evangelist, and Thomas Aquinas by Biagio d’Antonio, Madonna with Child, Musical Putti, St. John the Evangelist, and Blessed Giacomo Filippo Bertoni by the Master of the Bertoni Altarpiece; Flowers, Grapes, and Two Birds by Francesco Guardi; Dog and Basket by Arcangelo Resani; The Banks of Thessaly by Giorgio de Chirico (1926); Still Life by Giorgio Morandi (1953).

=== Museum of the Risorgimento and Contemporary Age ===
Inaugurated in 1904 and since 2009 housed on the main floor of the restored Palazzo Laderchi, the Museum of the Risorgimento and Contemporary Age of Faenza offers a collection of relics and documents related to historical figures and events in Faenza and its surroundings, starting from 1790, the date of the arrival of Napoleonic troops in the city, through the Unification of Italy, up to 1945.

=== Civic Museum of Natural Sciences ===
The "Malmerendi" Civic Museum of Natural Sciences was formally established in 1980, following the death of the Faenza surveyor Domenico Malmerendi, when his ornithological and entomological collection became public property. It also houses a collection of fauna with mammals and an abiotic section with fossils and minerals, making it currently the most important and extensive scientific-naturalistic institute in the province. The museum building is located at the center of a large green area of over 12,000 square meters, once used as a nursery and now transformed into the Paolo Liverani Botanical Garden.

=== Contemporary art museums ===
- Open-air museum of contemporary artworks: It features over 70 works displayed outdoors and in public access spaces, including ceramics, sculptures, bas-reliefs, high-reliefs, etc., which chronologically document the evolution of various styles and the connections among artists such as Rambelli, Matteucci, Biancini, Spagnulo, Nagasawa, Sottsass, Zauli, Sartelli, Stahler, Bombardieri, and many others. A complete catalog of the works with their respective geolocations is available on the Municipality's website.
- Territory Sector Museum: A contemporary art collection housed in the premises of the Municipal Palace in Via Zanelli.

=== Other museums ===
- Torricelli Museum: A collection of materials related to the scientist Evangelista Torricelli.
- Diocesan Museum of Sacred Art: A museum of sacred art.
- Carlo Zauli Museum: A museum of the ceramist Carlo Zauli.
- San Francesco Museum: A section of the namesake church and a testament to Faenza’s late Baroque.
- Gatti Workshop Museum: A museum of works by the ceramist Riccardo Gatti.
- Tramonti Museum: A house-museum of the artist Guerrino Tramonti.
- Hospital Museum and Church of St. John of God: A church with eighteenth-century paintings by Giovanni Gottardi, adjacent to the Hospital of the Infirm, with an attached museum room.
- Raffaele Bendandi Municipal Seismic Observatory and Museum: An observatory and library of the seismologist Raffaele Bendandi.
- Goffredo Gaeta Museum: A museum created from the studio-workshop of the ceramist Goffredo Gaeta.

== Media ==
=== Print ===
- (Since 1845) "Lunêri di Smémbar", likely the oldest almanac in Italy among those still in existence; it remains one of the most purchased calendars by the people of Romagna
- (Since 1899) "Il Piccolo", a weekly diocesan publication
- (Since 1996) "Sette Sere", a weekly publication

=== Radio ===
- Radio RCB

=== Television ===
- Tele1, a historic local and regional broadcaster, owned since 2014 by the Imola-based Di.TV

== Art ==
=== Ceramics ===
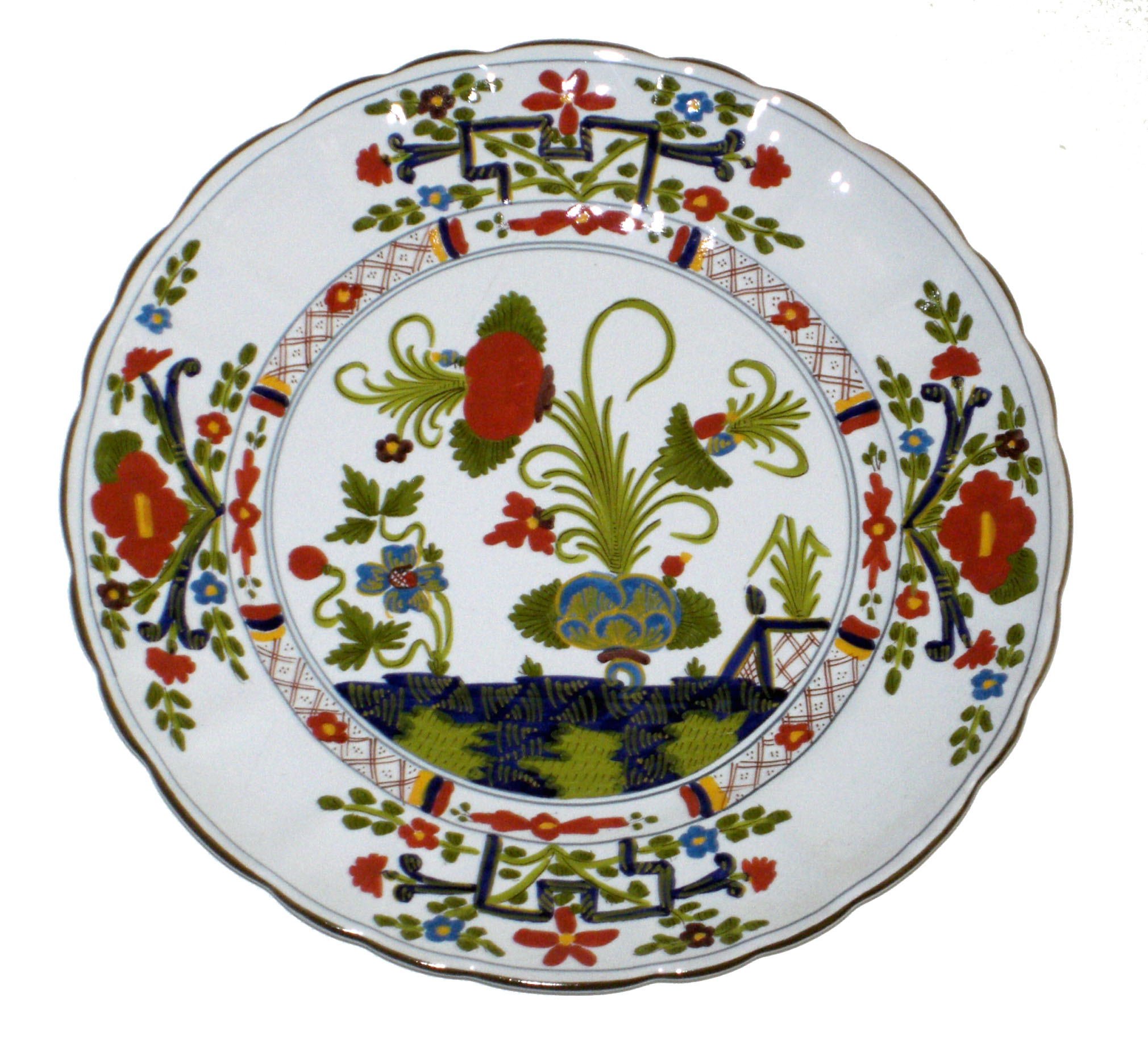
Plate decorated in the ‘Garofano’ style, one of the most characteristic of Faenza ceramics

Faenza is historically and internationally renowned for the production of artistic ceramics. The city's very name has become synonymous with ceramics (maiolica) in many languages, including the French faïence and the English faience. The first ceramic workshops emerged in Faenza in the 1st century BC. The production of ceramics was likely facilitated by the characteristics of the clays available in the waters of the Lamone River. However, Faenza became celebrated for its ceramics during the Renaissance. Faenza ceramics, known as maiolica, are ceramics coated with a tin-opacified glassy layer, a product that underwent slow and steady development in both ceramic techniques and color schemes and decorations, reaching the height of success in the 16th century, particularly thanks to the "Bianchi di Faenza".

In the city, numerous ceramic art workshops are active, producing both traditional and contemporary styles, whose activities and development are protected and promoted by the Ente Ceramica Faenza and the Italian Association of Ceramic Cities (AICC) through events and fairs that annually attract enthusiasts and artisans from around the world. Ceramic works, often donated by artists, are commonly and distinctively placed in municipal parks and gardens or at the center of roundabouts, traffic islands, or other structures.

In 2025, Faenza will join the UNESCO Creative Cities Network in the category of Crafts and Folk Arts, thanks to its historic ceramic tradition, which combines craftsmanship, design, research, and education within a distinctive creative system.

=== Neoclassicism ===
Neoclassicism was the cultural and artistic moment that characterized the city, particularly between 1780 and 1820. The exceptional creation of buildings, paintings, sculptures, decorations, and furnishings, involving artists and artisan workshops, made Faenza a reference point for neoclassical art throughout Europe. The works of architects and artists such as Giuseppe Pistocchi, Giovanni Antonio Antolini, Pietro Tomba, Felice Giani, Antonio Trentanove, Giovan Battista Ballanti Graziani, and Romolo Liverani were of great significance. The ultimate example of Faenza and Romagna neoclassical art is embodied in the Palazzo Milzetti, now a national museum.

=== Contemporary art ===
Faenza demonstrates a strong connection to its artistic cultural identity, offering its spaces since the early years of the 1900s to host, promote, and rigorously preserve works such as paintings, sculptures, installations, high-reliefs, bas-reliefs, and above all ceramics, by local, national, and international contemporary artists. These are displayed both in museum spaces (Territory Sector Museum) and in a true citywide "Open-air museum", cataloged with their respective geolocations.

== Theatre ==
Several theatre associations are active in the area. Notable among them are:

- Accademia Perduta / Romagna Teatri, which organizes theatrical events in Romagna, including at the Masini Theatre in Faenza
- Filodrammatica Berton at the Teatro dei Filodrammatici
- Teatro Due Mondi at the Casa del Teatro
- Compagnia delle Feste at the Teatro Fellini
- Compagnia Teatrale Angelo Solaroli at Palazzo Mazzolani
- Compagnia del Cancello and Compagnia L’InStabile at the Teatro San Giuseppe Artigiano

== Cinema ==
=== Films shot in Faenza ===
- The Doll (1963), directed by Giuseppe Orlandini
- China Is Near (1967), directed by Marco Bellocchio
- Corbari (1970), directed by Valentino Orsini
- The President of Borgorosso Football Club (1970), directed by Luigi Filippo D’Amico
- Holy God, Here Comes the Passatore! (1972), directed by Giuliano Carnimeo
- Claretta and Ben (1974), directed by Gian Luigi Polidoro
- Sex with a Smile (1976), directed by Sergio Martino
- The Eyes, the Mouth (1982), directed by Marco Bellocchio
- The Passionate (1988), directed by Gianfranco Mingozzi
- Ladronaia (1993), directed by Andrea Pedna
- Il più lungo giorno (1998), directed by Roberto Riviello
- The Pantani Case – The Murder of a Champion (2020), directed by Domenico Ciolfi
- Va bene così (2021), directed by Francesco Marioni
- Laura Pausini – Nice to Meet You (2022), directed by Ivan Cotroneo

== Cuisine ==
In the Faenza area, in addition to the typical cuisine of Romagna, local recipes are offered, such as:

=== San Lazzaro Tortelli ===
The "turtèll d'San Lazar" are made exclusively in Faenza on the occasion of the feast of Saint Lazarus, the fifth Sunday of Lent, in the Borgo Durbecco area and its surroundings. The tortello has an elongated shape with a wheat-spike closure, and some historians suggest that this shape may have been inspired by the figure of Lazarus wrapped in burial bandages. It was originally a simple dessert, but it has become more elaborate as living conditions have improved: today, the dough is made by mixing flour, eggs, milk, butter, and sugar, and the filling is a blend of boiled chestnuts with chocolate, jam, candied fruit, etc. It is served soaked in saba.

=== Faenza Ciambella ===
A local variant of the ciambella, which uses flour, sugar, butter, almonds, egg, lemon zest, yeast, and breadcrumbs.

=== Sugali ===
The "sugàl" (sugali) are pudding-like desserts traditionally prepared and consumed in autumn during the grape harvest. The Faenza recipe involves preparation with filtered grape must, wheat flour, and breadcrumbs, with the possible addition of cornmeal, lemon zest, and anise seeds.

=== Curzul ===
The curzùl are an egg pasta typically produced in the Ravenna and Forlì areas of Romagna, named for their resemblance to shoelaces: "curzul" in Romagnol means "laces". The typical recipe pairs it with ragù made with shallot.

=== Fried polenta ===
A distinctive preparation of polenta specific to the Faenza, Brisighella, and Castel Bolognese areas. It is prepared thick and firm and then fried.

== Events ==
=== Independent Labels Meeting ===
In Faenza, during the last weekend of September, and in the past during November, the event that has brought the largest number of visitors to the city takes place: the Independent Labels Meeting (MEI), a music event where record labels and musicians who identify as independent from major labels gather. Nationally renowned musicians participate with concerts over the 2–3 evenings of the event. The event takes place in the historic center.

=== 100 km del Passatore ===
On the last Saturday of May, the "100 km del Passatore" is held. It is an ultramarathon, considered by many to be folkloric but highly demanding, attracting over 1,000 participants from around the world each year. The race, first held in 1973, is named after the Passatore, a popular figure in the history and Romagnolo folklore.

The race's challenge lies not only in the distance (100 km, certified by IAU/IAAF) but also in the elevation: it starts in Florence (52 meters a.s.l.) and crosses the Apennines, reaching the highest point at the Colla di Casaglia Pass (913 m a.s.l.) before descending to Faenza (34 m a.s.l.). The race's significance in the ultramarathon landscape stems from its multiple designations as a European championship and, in 1991, a world championship.

=== International ceramic art events ===
Highly significant are the international events for contemporary and ancient artistic ceramics, organized by the Ente Ceramica, which attract artists, collectors, and maiolica enthusiasts from around the world. Among these, notable events include:

- Argillà Italia, a market-exhibition dedicated to artistic ceramics, accompanied by conferences and cultural events, held every two years on the first weekend of September along the streets of the historic center, stretching from the main square to the International Museum of Ceramics
- Buongiorno Ceramica, an event held annually on the first weekend of June, involving all cities part of the Italian Association of Ceramic Cities, consisting of special openings of ceramic museums and workshops with guided tours and workshops for enthusiasts

=== NOAM Faenza Film Festival ===
The first event in Italy to promote cinema and North American culture, with a particular focus on independent productions, characterized by numerous events and screenings of films featuring USA, Canada, Mexico, and beyond.

=== Other events ===
- San Rocco Fair: The oldest fair in the city, dating back to the 15th century. It takes place in the historic center, mainly around the Church of San Rocco, on the first Sunday of November.
- San Lazzaro Carnival: An ancient carnival celebration with a parade of allegorical floats, music, and gastronomy, held in Borgo Durbecco on Saint Lazarus day, the Sunday before Palm Sunday.
- Music in the Aie – Castel Raniero Folk Festival: A music competition for folk groups from across Italy, held annually on the second weekend of May in the evocative Faenza locality of Castel Raniero in the hills.
- Torrone Festival: Held on 8 December. The streets between Piazza del Popolo and the Church of San Francesco, where celebrations of the Immaculate Conception are particularly solemn, are filled with stalls and food stands. The most sold product is torrone.

== Human geography ==
=== Historical subdivisions ===
Faenza is historically divided into districts:

District	Alternative name	Location in the historic center
Rione Giallo	District of Porta Ponte	
Rione Verde	District of Porta Montanara	
Rione Rosso	District of Porta Imolese	
Rione Nero	District of Porta Ravegnana	
Borgo Durbecco	District of Porta delle Chiavi	

The four districts—Giallo, Rosso, Nero, and Verde—reflect the colors and ancient administrative division of the municipality, still visible in old city maps preserved in the municipal library. The district territories are separated by the four main city streets, the ancient cardo and decumanus from the Roman period, and they replicate the historical early medieval division of the city of Faenza into four districts.

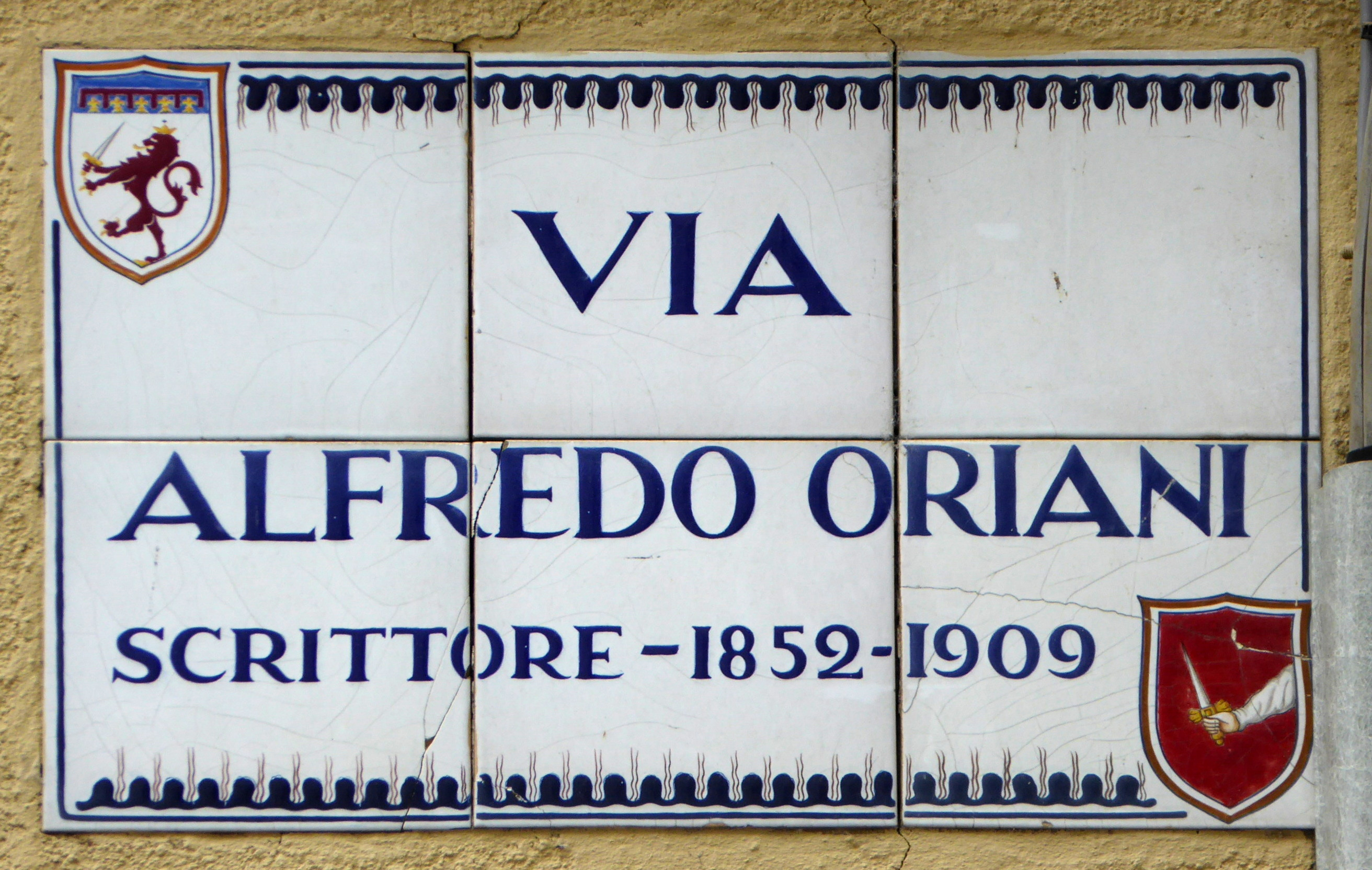
Typical toponymic plaque in maiolica from one of the streets in the historic center, featuring the municipal coat of arms in the top left and the coat of arms of the respective district in the bottom right

The Borgo Durbecco, the area of the city on the right bank of the Lamone River developed during the late medieval period, was established as a district in 1959 to include this neighborhood in the events of the Palio del Niballo.

=== Administrative subdivisions ===
The municipality is divided into five circoscrizioni, each hosting its respective neighborhood advisory bodies:

- Centro Nord District
- Centro Sud District
- Borgo District
- Granarolo District
- Reda District

=== Hamlets ===
The municipality of Faenza includes the following hamlets and localities (in alphabetical order):

- Albereto
- Basiago
- Borgo Tuliero
- Castel Raniero
- Celle
- Còsina
- Errano
- Felisio
- Fossolo
- Granarolo
- Marzeno
- Merlaschio
- Mezzeno
- Oriolo dei Fichi
- Pieve Cesato
- Pieve Corleto
- Pieve Ponte
- Prada
- Reda
- Rivalta
- Ronco
- San Barnaba
- San Biagio
- San Pier Laguna
- San Silvestro
- Santa Lucia
- Sant'Andrea
- Sarna
- Tebano

== Economy ==
=== Industry ===
Faenza is an industrialized city. The most developed sectors in the area include: mechanical engineering, automation and robotics, advanced composite materials and ceramics, industrial ceramics, and the food industry.

Several companies are based in the city, notably: CISA, a lock manufacturing company; Caviro, a leader in wine and alcohol production; Mokador and Rekico, coffee roasting companies from this area; Tampieri Holding, specialized in energy production, vegetable oils, and water purification; Bucci Industries, a leader in mechanical engineering, automation, and composite materials.
In the automotive sector, two prominent teams are present: Racing Bulls F1 Team (formerly known as Minardi and Toro Rosso / AlphaTauri) and Gresini Racing, both active in world-class championships.

The industrial zone is spread across geographically distinct areas:

- San Silvestro Industrial Zone, north of the city along Via Granarolo, between Via San Silvestro and the Faenza-Ravenna railway line;
- Autostrada Industrial Zone, between the provincial road 7 ("Felisio") and the A14 motorway;
- Boària Industrial Zone, west of the city center along Via della Boària and Viale Risorgimento, between the Faenza-Florence railway line and the northern side of the Via Emilia;
- Filippina Industrial Zone, east of the city center, between Via Reda and Via Soldata.

=== Crafts ===
Faenza is particularly renowned for the production of artistic ceramics (known as faience) and wrought iron.

==== Historic workshops ====
In accordance with the regional law on the promotion and enhancement of historic workshops, the municipality has registered the city's still-operational historic workshops in a dedicated Municipal Register, as craft activities significant for the city's tradition and culture.

=== Agriculture ===
Local agriculture is based on the production of cereals, wheat, vegetables (such as shallot, potato, zucchini), fodder, grapes (including Albana, Centesimino, Sangiovese), and fruits (such as peach and nectarine, flat peach, kiwifruit, pear, apricot, pomegranate), complemented by the breeding of cattle, pigs, sheep, goats, horses, and poultry.

Historically, the cultivation and spread of local varieties of strawberry and watermelon were notable, primarily produced in the Punta degli Orti area.

=== Services ===
Accommodation facilities offer dining and lodging options. Social facilities include daycare centers, retirement homes, and a sheltered housing facility. Healthcare services are provided by a private clinic and the local hospital, which also serves the municipalities of the Faenza Romagna Union.

Banking, broadcasting, and IT consulting activities are also present.

== Infrastructure and transport ==
=== Roads ===
Faenza is crossed from southeast to northwest by the State road 9 Via Emilia and the A14 Bologna-Taranto motorway and from northeast to southwest by the provincial road 302 Brisighellese Ravennate.

=== Railways ===
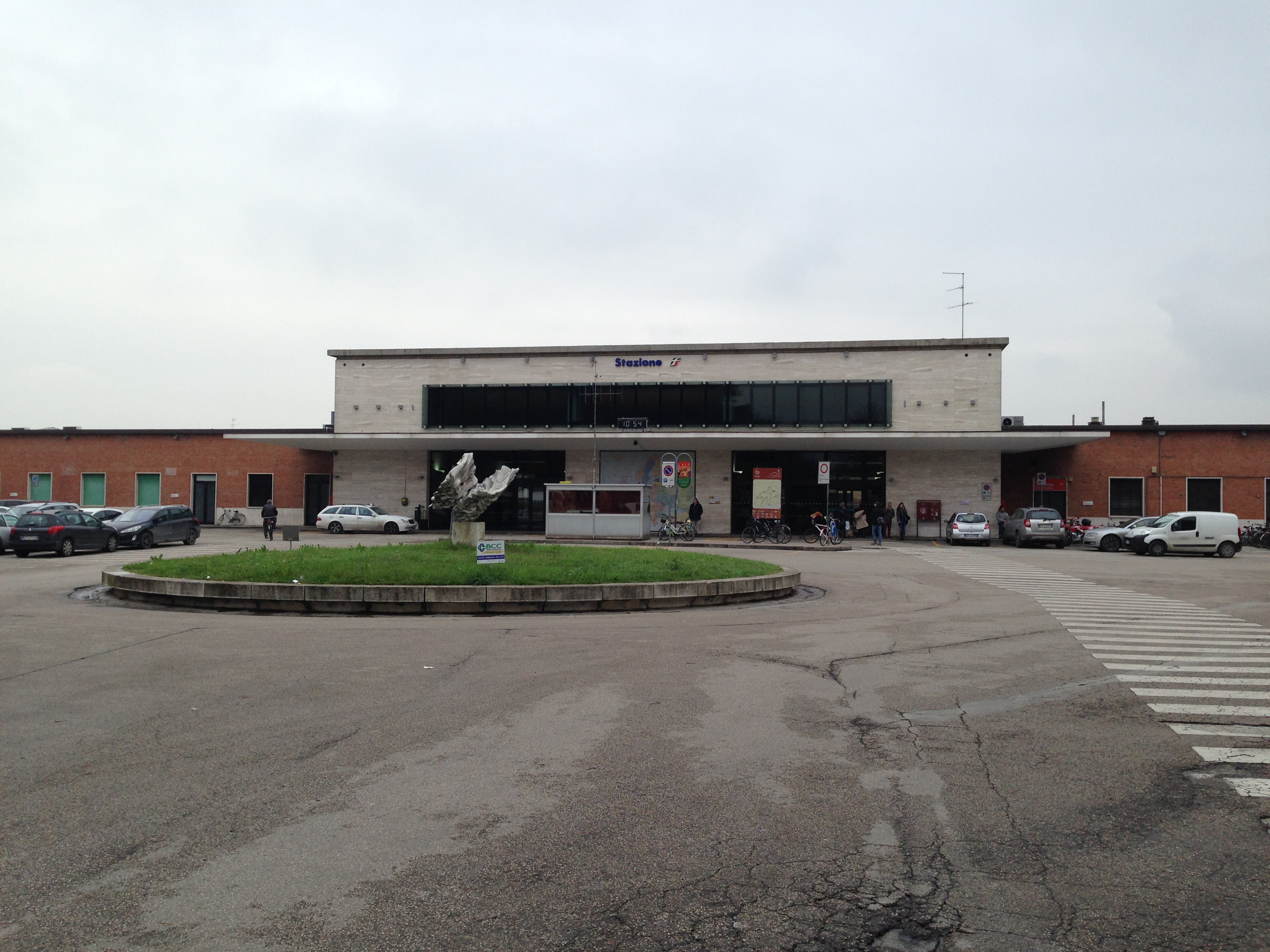
Faenza FS Station

The Faenza railway station is located on the Bologna-Ancona line and serves as the terminus for the Florence-Faenza, Faenza-Ravenna, and Faenza-Lavezzola lines.

=== Urban mobility ===
Faenza has an urban transport service consisting of two bus lines operated by Start Romagna, which also manages intercity services based at the terminal in Viale delle Ceramiche.

Since 2013, a free public transport service with electric minibuses (Green-Go Bus) has been active, consisting of two lines connecting both the western and eastern parts of Faenza with the city center.

== Administration ==
The administration of Faenza was characterized by a communal period, with prominent figures such as consuls, followed by a foreign podestà, and later, in the period between the two world wars, by a people's council led by Mayor Count Antonio Zucchini. This council, representing the People's Party, was distinguished for its commitment, integrity, and support for productive sectors and tenant farmers, opposing the rise of fascism.

Since 1 January 2012, the municipality of Faenza has been the capital of the Faenza Romagna Union.

=== Mayors since 1946 ===
Period		Office holder	Party	Title	Notes
2 April 1946	22 June 1951	Alfredo Morini	PSI	Mayor	
22 June 1951	10 August 1956	Pietro Baldi	DC	Mayor	
10 August 1956	6 March 1972	Elio Assirelli	DC	Mayor	Re-elected in 1960, 1964, and 1970.
24 March 1972	16 December 1974	Angelo Gallegati	DC	Mayor	
16 December 1974	1 September 1975	Pietro Baccarini	DC	Mayor	
1 September 1975	30 September 1981	Veniero Lombardi	PCI	Mayor	
1 October 1981	24 March 1993	Giorgio Boscherini	PSI	Mayor	Re-elected on 30 October 1985 and 19 July 1990. Resigned in 1993.
25 March 1993	17 January 1994	Nerio Tura	DC	Mayor	
12 June 1994	30 April 1999	Enrico De Giovanni	PPI	Mayor	Re-elected on 24 May 1998. Died during the term.
1 May 1999	30 March 2010	Claudio Casadio	DS, then PD	Mayor	Acting mayor until 15 April 2000. Re-elected on 6 April 2005.
30 March 2010	22 September 2020	Giovanni Malpezzi	PD	Mayor	Re-elected on 15 June 2015.
22 September 2020	incumbent	Massimo Isola	PD	Mayor	

=== Twin towns ===
Faenza is twinned with:

- (Japan) Toki, since 1979
- (Croatia) Rijeka, since 1983
- (Spain) Talavera de la Reina, since 1986
- (Romania) Timișoara, since 1991
- (Greece) Amarousio, since 1992
- (France) Bergerac, since 1998
- (Germany) Schwäbisch Gmünd, since 2001
- (Austria) Gmunden, since 2008
- (China) Jingdezhen, since 2013

== Sports ==
=== Motorsport ===
==== Formula 1 ====
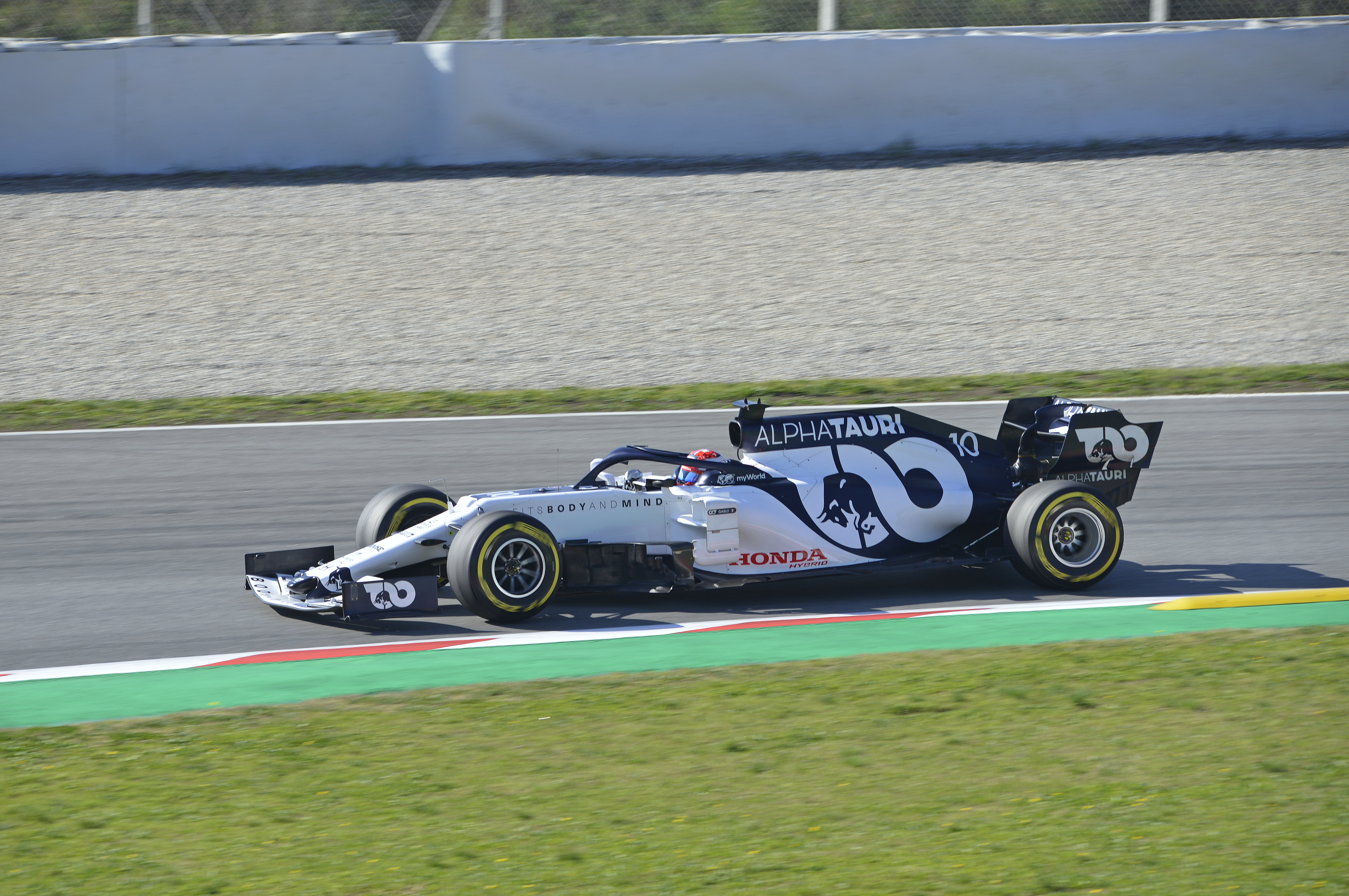
Pierre Gasly driving the AlphaTauri AT01

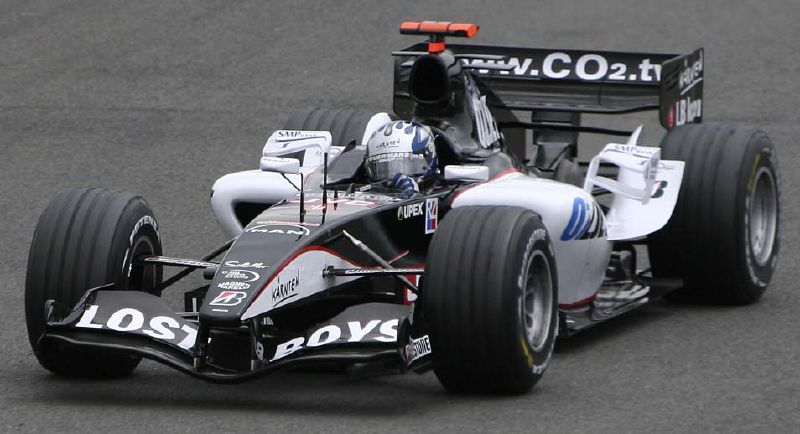
The PS05, the last car of the Minardi team

The city boasts a historic presence of a F1 team: founded in 1979 by Giancarlo Minardi as the Minardi Team, the group was acquired in 2005 by Red Bull and renamed Scuderia Toro Rosso. From 2020, for marketing purposes, it became Scuderia AlphaTauri. From 2024, following a general reorganization, it was renamed Racing Bulls F1 Team.

Of particular note is the team's first overall victory with the Toro Rosso STR3 by driver Sebastian Vettel at the 2008 Italian Grand Prix in Monza and the victory of Pierre Gasly in 2020, also at Monza, with the AlphaTauri AT01.

=== Wrestling ===
The Club Atletico Faenza Wrestling Section "CISA" is active in Greco-Roman wrestling. Since 1919, many athletes, including at the Olympic level, have achieved a significant number of victories. Members of the club have included Ercole Gallegati, Gian Matteo Ranzi, Antonio Randi, and Vincenzo Maenza (two-time Olympic champion in 1984 and 1988), as well as Andrea Minguzzi (Olympic champion in 2008) and Daigoro Timoncini (three Olympics: Beijing 2008, London 2012, and Rio de Janeiro 2016).

=== Motorcycling ===
In 1905, a group of local motorcyclists organized motorcycle gatherings and created the Faenza Moto Club. In 1911, the association became part of the Moto Club Italia (which became the FMI in 1946). From 1932 to 1956, the out-of-town "Bocche dei Canali" circuit was in operation, at the time the fastest among national circuits. Major motorcycle manufacturers used it to test bikes debuting in Grand Prix races: models such as the Gilera 125 "Mosca Bianca", the Mondial 125, and the MV 125 of 1947 were tested in Faenza.
The Faenza circuit gained international fame during the Grand Prix of the Nations (as the Italian Grand Prix was then called) in 1948, which for the first time left its historic venue in Monza to be held in Romagna. The 125 cm³, 250 cm³, and 500 cm³ categories competed. That same year, Faenza champion Francesco Lama, one of the protagonists of Italian motorcycling in the 1930s, retired from his career. In subsequent years, the "Bocche dei Canali" circuit hosted the "City of Ceramics" Cup, often valid as a race in the Italian Speed Championship Category I.

==== Motorcycle World Championship ====
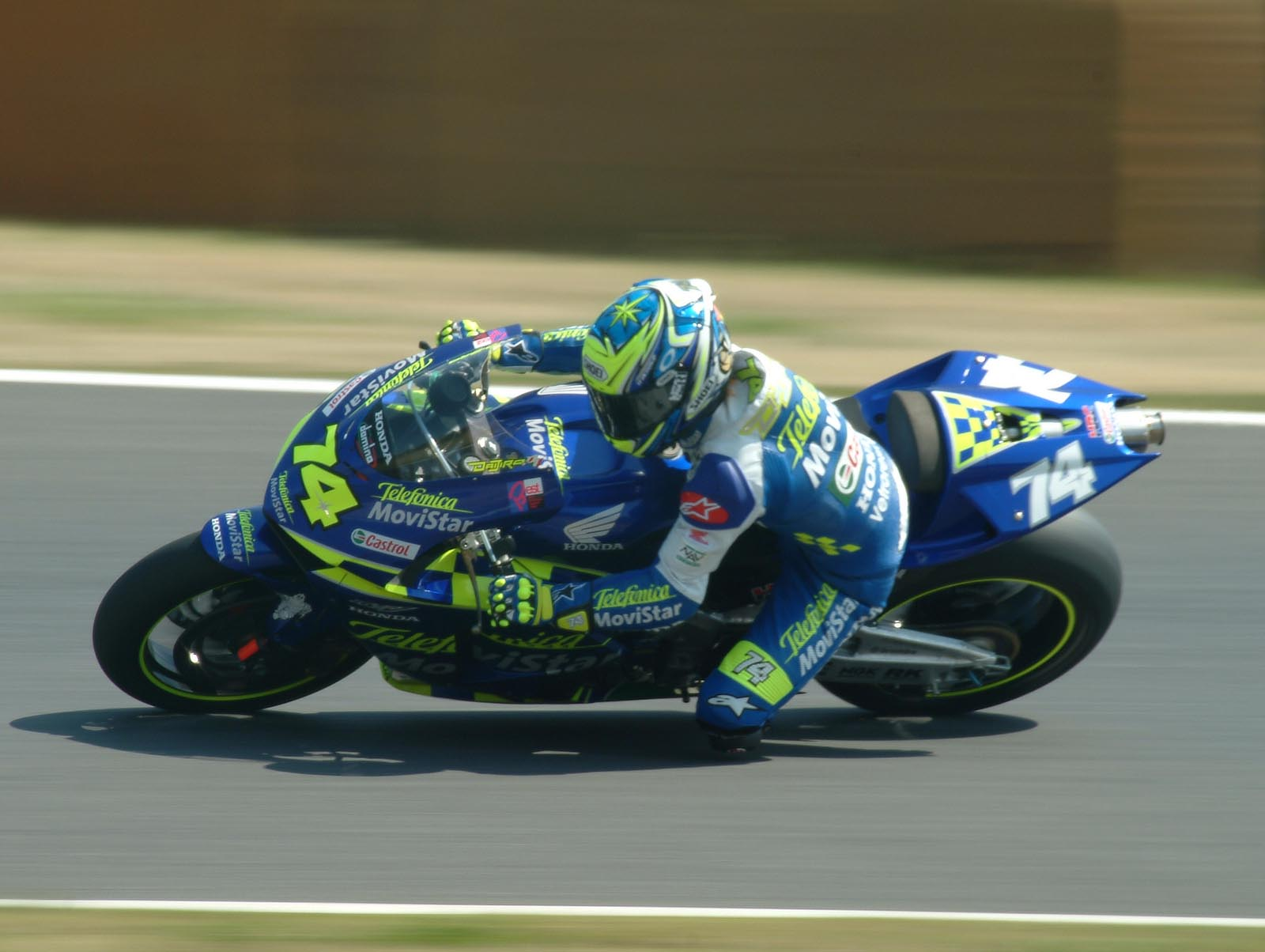
Daijiro Kato, 250cc world champion in 2001 with the Team Gresini

The motorcycling team Gresini Racing, based in Faenza, founded by two-time 125 cm³ world champion Fausto Gresini, currently competes in the Grand Prix motorcycle racing in the MotoGP, Moto2, and MotoE categories. Notable results include those achieved by Daijiro Kato (champion in the 250 cm³ class in 2001), Toni Elías (champion in Moto2 in 2010), Jorge Martín (champion in Moto3 in 2018), and Matteo Ferrari (champion in MotoE in 2019).

==== Motocross ====
After World War II, the first track suitable for motocross races, the Isola Circuit, was built. Improvised on the left bank of the Lamone, it was located a few hundred meters from the historic center. In 1957, a national motocross championship race was held at the Isola Circuit. Faenza's motocross activity continued in the following years at another temporary circuit located in the hills a few kilometers from the city. In the early 1970s, the idea of creating a permanent track took shape. An area near Monte Coralli, adjacent to the hamlet of Tebano, was chosen. The "Monte Coralli Crossodromo" was inaugurated in 1972 and is still active, initiated by the then-president of the Faenza Moto Club, Gigi Lama. In 1979, it hosted a Motocross World Championship race for the first time (Italian Grand Prix, 27 May). Since then, it has hosted other races valid for the world championship.

In 2024, after a complete renovation, the track was renamed "04 Park – Monte Coralli," a sports center for motocross riders established at the initiative of Andrea Dovizioso, in collaboration with the Municipality of Faenza and the Italian Motorcycle Federation.

=== Swimming ===
The ASD Centro Sub Nuoto Club 2000 is a FIN Federal Swimming School at the Faenza Municipal Swimming Center, active in competitive and amateur aquatic disciplines, primarily swimming and diving, and, since the 2000s, synchronized swimming and water polo; among the titles achieved, notable are two Italian Swimming Championships and, for underwater photography, three World Championships and four Italian Championships. Noteworthy is the participation of Annalisa Nisiro in the Seoul 1988 Olympics.

=== Basketball ===
The most successful basketball team in Faenza is the Club Atletico Faenza. Founded in the immediate post-war period, the women's team boasts 64 years of senior-level history, with 53 participations in the national top league, including 16 consecutive seasons. It won two Italian Cups: in 2007 and 2009.

Since 2015, the main women’s basketball club has been "Faenza Basket Project". It acquired the Serie B sports title from another local club and immediately won the championship. After a few years in Serie A2, in the 2020/21 season, the club achieved promotion to Serie A1.

Currently, at the men's level, Raggisolaris Faenza is active, competing in the Serie B Nazionale.

=== Handball ===
Pallamano Romagna was formed in 2019 from the merger of Romagna Handball (Imola-Mordano) with Handball Faenza and later with Pallamano Lugo. It manages two senior handball teams competing in Serie A Silver and Serie B.
The founding clubs were established in 1973 (Imola), 1981 (Mordano), and 1983 (Faenza). Handball in Faenza was introduced by brothers Claudio and Guido Leotta. The first coach of the white-and-blue team was Alfonso Saviotti (1937–2025).

=== Volleyball ===
Faenza had a men's team that competed in Serie A in the 1970s: the Società Polisportiva "Ebro Masotti" (SPEM). Founded in the 1960s, the team started in the lower leagues. From the Promozione championship, it climbed to Serie A with a promotion each year. It competed in the top league for three seasons:

- 1970–71;
- 1975–76;
- 1976–77. In the latter year, it won the Federal Trophy, a precursor to the Italian Cup.

From 1976 to 1979, it was coached by Sergio Guerra. It played home games at the PalaBubani. The team also included a foreign player, the Czechoslovak Jiri Barda.

Today, the Pallavolo Faenza club is active in both men's and women's championships, competing in Serie B and Serie B2, respectively.

=== Pallone col Bracciale ===
Pallone col bracciale, or "ball game" as it is commonly known by Faenza residents, is one of Italy's oldest national games and is still practiced in some localities, including Faenza, especially in tournaments during folkloric and commemorative events, at the municipal sphaeristerium.

=== Tennis ===
Since its founding in 1927, the Club Atletico Faenza Tennis has produced numerous national and international champions, such as Raffaella Reggi (WTA No. 13) and Andrea Gaudenzi (ATP No. 18). Flora Perfetti, Francesca Bentivoglio, and Gianluca Rinaldini are also noteworthy, as they all reached the top 100 in the world.

=== Other sports associations ===
- Faenza Calcio 1912 competes in Group B of the Eccellenza Emilia-Romagna.
- The local athletics club is ASD Atletica 85 Faenza, founded in 1957 and resulting from the 1985 merger between Atletica Faenza and Libertas.
- In the hamlet of Reda, ASD Reda Volley is active, where national team player Serena Ortolani began her competitive career.
- The New Faenza Baseball Roosters competes in the Italian Baseball championship in Serie C Federale.
- APD Faventia 1998 competes in Group D of the Serie B of Futsal.
- The Società Ciclistica Faentina (S.C. Faentina) continues the activities of Ciclo Sport Faenza, a club that has organized competitive road cycling in the city since 1907.
- ASD Arcieri Faentini practices archery.
- Since 2014, the city has had an American football team, originally named Broncos Faenza and renamed Roosters Romagna in 2022, which became Italian Champion 2022 in the 9-a-side American football championship.
- Faenza Rugby is a team active in the Serie C1 of Rugby union.
- ASD Sala d’Arme Achille Marozzo Romagna Sforzesca is one of the leading associations for the practice and promotion of historical fencing in Italy.

=== Sports facilities ===
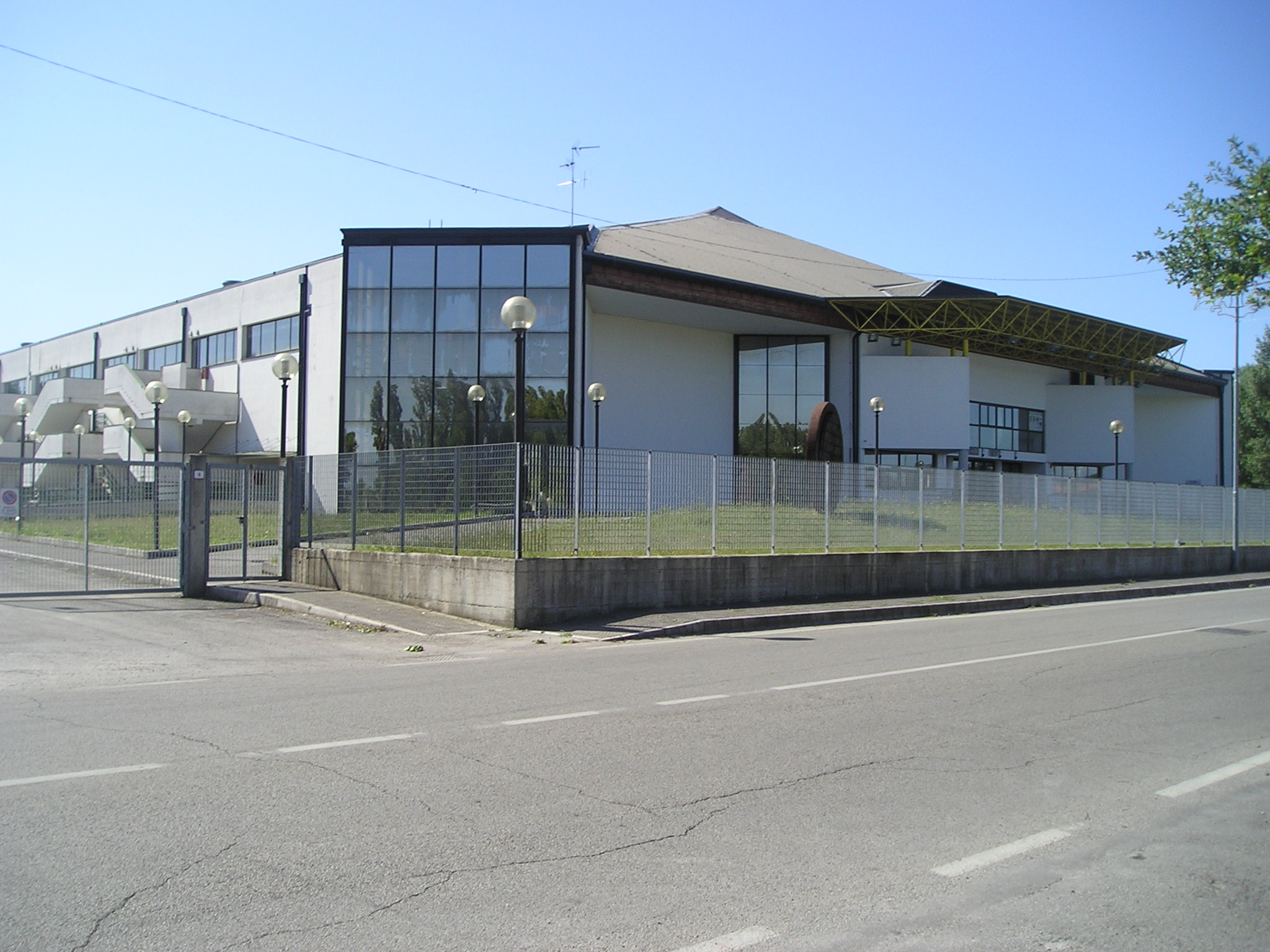
PalaCattani

- PalaCattani, formerly PalaMokador, is Faenza's largest sports facility, with 5,000 seats. It currently hosts men's basketball games for Raggisolaris (Serie B) and futsal games for Faventia (Serie B).
- Stadio Bruno Neri, the city's second-largest facility with 2,800 seats, is located in Piazzale Pancrazi, designed to host Faenza Calcio (Eccellenza) matches and events of the Palio del Niballo and Bigorda d’Oro.
- PalaBubani, formerly PalaCofra, is located in Piazzale Pancrazi, near the Stadio Bruno Neri and the municipal swimming pool. It hosts volleyball matches for Faenza Volley (Serie C).
- The Municipal Swimming Center, comprising the Piazzale Pancrazi facilities: the outdoor facility (operational from late May to early September) with a 50 m pool equipped with a slide and a recreational pool with a lawn for cooling off; the indoor facility (open 363 days a year) consisting of a 25 m × 6-lane pool, a 25 m × 3-lane pool with a 4 m deep area, and two smaller pools with temperatures of 30 °C and 32 °C; since 2014, the covered facility in Via Marozza has been active, featuring a 25 m × 6-lane pool.
- The Monte Coralli Crossodromo, located in the first hills south of the city in the hamlet of Tebano, has been active since the 1970s.
- The Graziola Sports Field, in Viale Atleti Azzurri d’Italia, includes facilities for various sports, including: Athletics, Running, Rugby, American Football, Football, Baseball.
- The "Vito Ortelli" Cycling Circuit, in Via Lesi, is the base for S.C. Faentina’s sports activities and is open to the public, named after Faenza cycling champion Vito Ortelli.
- The "Le Cicogne" Golf Club, a 9-hole golf course on the southwestern outskirts of the city.
- Municipal Sphaeristerium "Oreste Macrelli", in Piazza Fratti, where pallone col bracciale and tamburello are practiced.
- The National Shooting Range, in Via San Martino.
- The Archery Field, in Piazzale Tambini.
- The Aerlight Faenza Airfield is the operational base of the "Ready To Fly n. 397" Flight School. Located a few kilometers from Faenza, at Via Plicca n. 2, the facility is equipped with hangars and a clubhouse for pilots.

== Notable people ==
- Ottaviano da Faenza, 14th century painter
- Pace di Bartolo (fl. 1344–1368), painter
- Bittino da Faenza (1357–1427), painter
- Andrea Bertoni (1454–1483), Catholic priest of the Servite Order
- Giovanni Battista Bertucci, 16th century painter
- Jacopo Bertucci, 16th century painter
- Antonio da Faenza (died 1534), painter and architect
- Ferraù Fenzoni (1562–1645), painter and draughtsman
- Giuseppe Sarti (born 1729), composer
- Dario Resta (1882–1924), racing driver
- Bruno Neri (1910–1944), footballer and antifascist partisan
- Filippo Monti (1928–2015), architect
- Giancarlo Minardi (born 1947), businessman, owner of the Minardi Formula One team
- Fabio Babini (born 1969), racing driver
- Laura Pausini (born 1974), singer and composer
- Samantha Casella (born 1981), director and screenwriter
- Matteo Nannini (born 2003), racing driver
- Andrea Frassineti (born 2006), racing driver

== See also ==
- Battle of Faventia
- Battle of Faenza
- Roman Catholic Diocese of Faenza-Modigliana

== Bibliography ==
- Carlo Morbio, «Faenza», in History of Italian Municipalities, Milan, 1837.
- Bartolomeo Righi, Annals of the City of Faenza, Montanari e Marabini Press, Faenza, 1840–1841.
- Montanari Antonio, Historical Guide to Faenza, Marabini Press, Faenza 1882.
- Antonio Messeri, Achille Calzi, Faenza in History and Art, Faenza Social Typography, Faenza 1909.
- Antonio Archi, M. Teresa Piccinini, Faenza as it was: architecture and urban events, churches and convents, families and palaces, Lega Press, Faenza 1973.
- Ennio Golfieri, Guide to the City of Faenza, Faenza, Municipality, 1979.
- Alteo Dolcini, The Sacred Fires of Forlì and Faenza, Faenza Typography, Faenza 1997.
- Antonio Saltini, M. Teresa Salomoni, Stefano Rossi Cescati, Via Emilia. Unusual Routes Among the Municipalities of the Ancient Consular Road, Edagricole, Bologna 2003, ISBN 88-506-4958-4.
- AA. VV. (edited by Alessandro Montevecchi), Faenza in the Twentieth Century, Edit Faenza, Faenza 2003, ISBN 88-8152-111-3.
- Fausto Renzi, The Manfredi. Lords of Faenza and Imola, Cesena, Il Ponte Vecchio, 2010.
- Gabriele Albonetti, History of Faenza. From Prehistory to the Year 2000, Cesena, Il Ponte Vecchio, 2018. ISBN 978-88-6541-786-7.
- Domenico Savini, Andrea Tanganelli, Illustrious Families of Faenza, Cesena, Il Ponte Vecchio, 2019. ISBN 978-88-6541-884-0.
