= Giovanni Antonio Antolini =

Italian architect and writer (1753–1841)

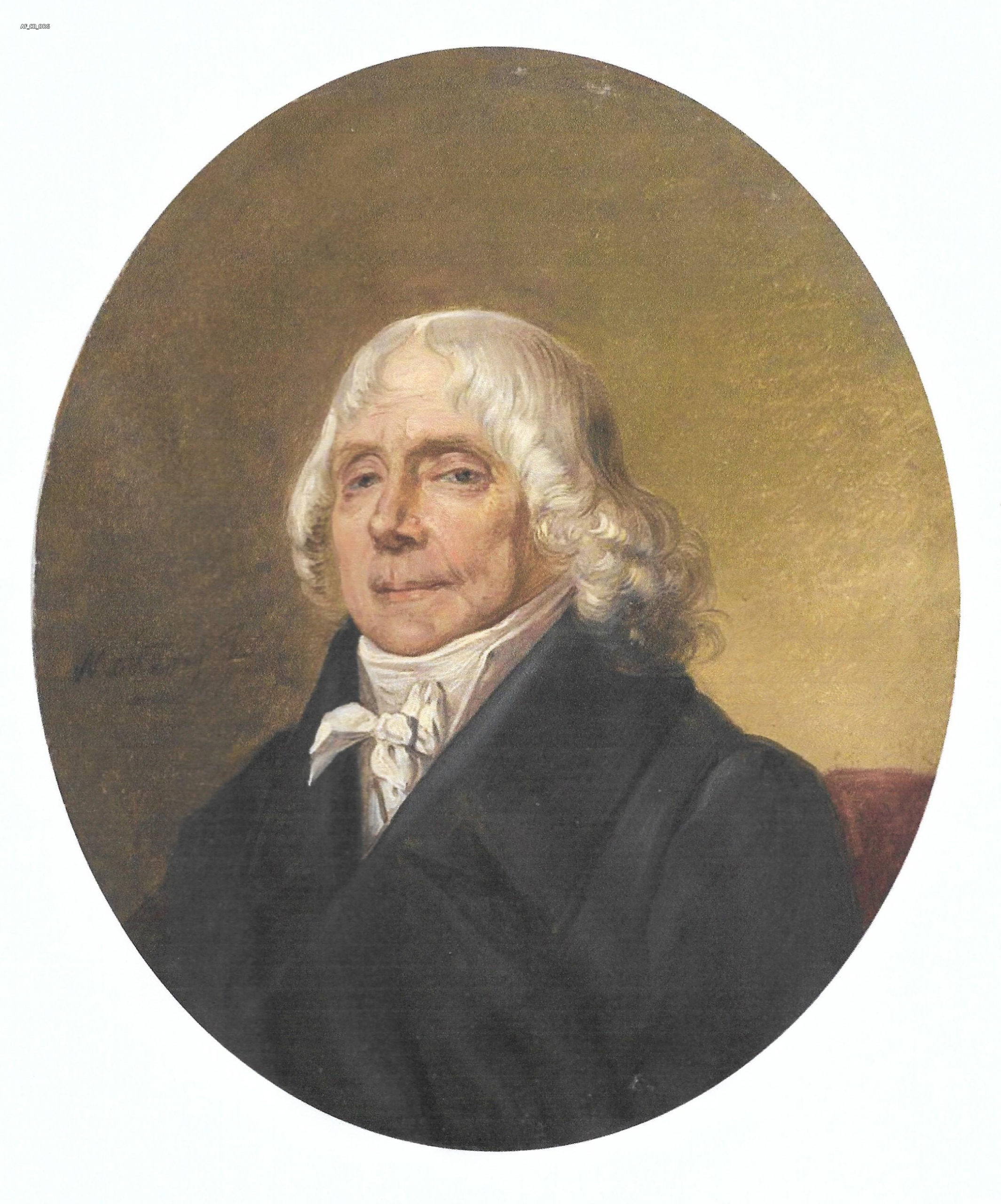
- Portrait of Giovanni Antonio Antolini by Giuseppe Molteni
- Born: 11 September 1753; Castel Bolognese, Papal States
- Died: 11 March 1841 (aged 87); Bologna, Papal States
- Education: University of Bologna
- Occupation: Architect
- Employers: University of Bologna; Brera Academy
- Movement: Neoclassicism
- Projects: Foro Bonaparte, Milan

Giovanni Antonio Antolini (11 September 1753 – 11 March 1841) was an Italian architect and writer. His most ambitious work was the uncompleted Foro Bonaparte at Milan, an idealistic and visionary project later modified by Luigi Canonica. Antolini's projects are important to the history of revolutionary and imperial architecture that developed out of the later phases of Neoclassicism.

== Biography ==
Giovanni Antonio Antolini was born in Castel Bolognese, near Ravenna, on 11 September 1753. When still quite young, he was taught geometry and hydraulics by the engineer Vincenzo Baruzzi. He studied architecture at the University of Bologna and established his career in Rome, where he moved in his early 20s. In 1776, he assisted with the drainage of the Pontine Marshes but, after catching malaria, soon returned to Rome. As a result, he decided to devote the rest of his career to architecture.

=== Early works ===
Like many 18th-century Italian architects, Antolini was attracted by the study of ancient monuments: in 1785 he published his first important archaeological work on the Temple of Hercules at Cori and began his studies on the Temple of Minerva at Assisi. During this period he also produced schemes for palaces, chapels and other buildings for noble foreign clients, including a design for the façade of the palace and court chapel of the Duke of Courland at Mitau (now Jelgava, Latvia). He also designed the Schimmelmann Mausoleum in Wandsbek, realized after his plans by German architect Carl Gottlob Horn (1734-1807). In Rome Antolini developed close ties with a group of Neoclassical architects and decorators which included Felice Giani, Paolo Bargigli, and, above all, Giuseppe Barberi.

During the French intervention in Italy (1796–1815) Antolini, who sympathized with the revolutionary ideology, was summoned to Faenza (1796), where he designed a Doric triumphal arch to the glory of the French nation. Inaugurated in 1799, it was decorated with bas-reliefs by the sculptor Villafranca but was quickly destroyed by the Austrians. After the French returned, it was rebuilt to celebrate the Battle of Marengo but was then again demolished.

=== Foro Bonaparte ===
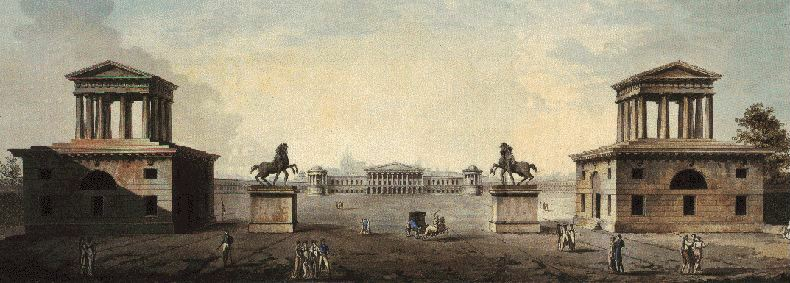
Plans for the Foro Bonaparte in Milan (city side)

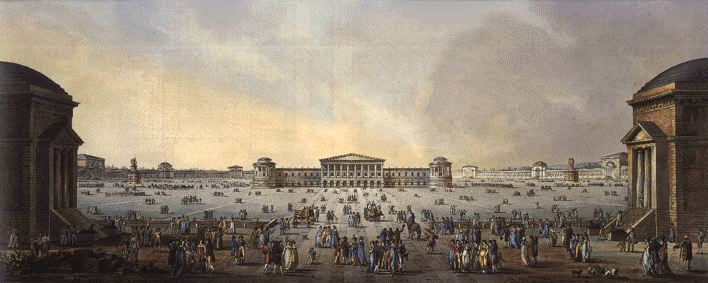
Plans for the Foro Bonaparte in Milan (seen from the Porta Sempione)

In 1801, after the French had returned to Milan, Antolini was commissioned to draw up plans for redesigning the city in the around the Sforza Castle which Napoleon had begun to demolish. Antolini, however, in his Foro Bonaparte (Bonaparte Forum) project which was inspired by the Forum of Ancient Rome and by the works of the French architect Claude Nicolas Ledoux, proposed keeping the core of the castle, adding a facing of Doric columns, and developing a vast circular plaza around, some 570 metres in diameter. Surrounded by a Doric colonnade, the plaza was to be bordered by administrative buildings, ministries, court houses, baths, theatres, universities and museums.

There were also plans for large areas to be devoted to commerce, the stores being connected through a system of canals to the city's Navigli. The main objective of the ambitious project was to move the city centre from the Piazza del Duomo, then surrounded by narrow medieval streets, to the newly planned Foro which would thus become the hub of city life.

Evaluated and modified several times by a special commission, the plans finally shelved owing to the sheer grandeur of the project. Although Napoleon was strongly behind it, it was finally deemed too ambitious for a city the size of Milan. The Foro Bonaparte plans were however not completely abandoned: once Antolini's design had been set aside, the project was entrusted to Luigi Canonica who completely reworked it into developing the area essentially for private residences.

Antolini's original plans were however considered to be one of the most important endeavors of Neoclassical architecture, so much so that the Foro Bonaparte was soon to inspire Naples' semicircular Piazza del Plebiscito with the church of San Francesco di Paola.

=== Piazza San Marco in Venice ===
In 1815, Antolini's plans for the rebuilding of the west end of St Mark's Square in Venice, where the old church of San Geminiano and extensions of the Procuratie Vecchie and Procuratie Nuove were demolished as part of Napoleonic schemes for alterations to the Piazza, also ran into trouble. The commission was finally given to the architect Giuseppe Maria Soli who radically altered Antolini's designs.

=== Later life ===
From 1803 to 1815, Antolini was professor of architecture at the University of Bologna. For political reasons, he returned to Milan in 1815 where he taught architecture at the Brera Academy for the remainder of his life. He continued to author works on both hydraulics and architecture including proposals for straightening the River Topino in Umbria and designs for a bridge over the Tiber at Città di Castello. In 1820, Antolini was admitted as a foreign associate member of the Académie des Beaux-Arts. He died in Bologna on 11 March 1841. Antolini's style was representative of the Neoclassical taste of the late Roman 18th century, marked by the rationalist and functionalist influence of Carlo Lodoli and Francesco Milizia and the utopian outlook of the visionary French architects Étienne-Louis Boullée and Ledoux, although it contrasted with the more imaginative, sometimes eclectic approach of his contemporary Giuseppe Pistocchi, who produced many schemes to rival those of Antolini.

== Writings ==
- L'ordine dorico ossia il Tempio d'Ercole nella città di Cori umiliato alla Santità di N. S. Papa Pio VI (Rome, 1785)
- Il Tempio di Minerva in Assisi confrontato colle tavole di Andrea Palladio (Milan, 1803, rev. 1828)
- Opera d’architettura, ossia, progetto sul foro che doveva eseguirsi in Milano dal professore G. Antolini (Parma, 1806)
- Idee elementari di architettura civile per le scuole del disegno (Bologna, 1813)
- Osservazioni ed aggiunte ai principii di architettura civile di F. Milizia (Milan, 1817)
- Le rovine di Veleja misurate e disegnate, 2 vols (Milan, 1819–22)
- "Biografia dell'architetto Giovanni Antonio Antolini, scritta da sé medesimo". Giornale Arcadico di Scienze, Lettere ed Arti. 91: 342–9. 1842.

== Gallery ==
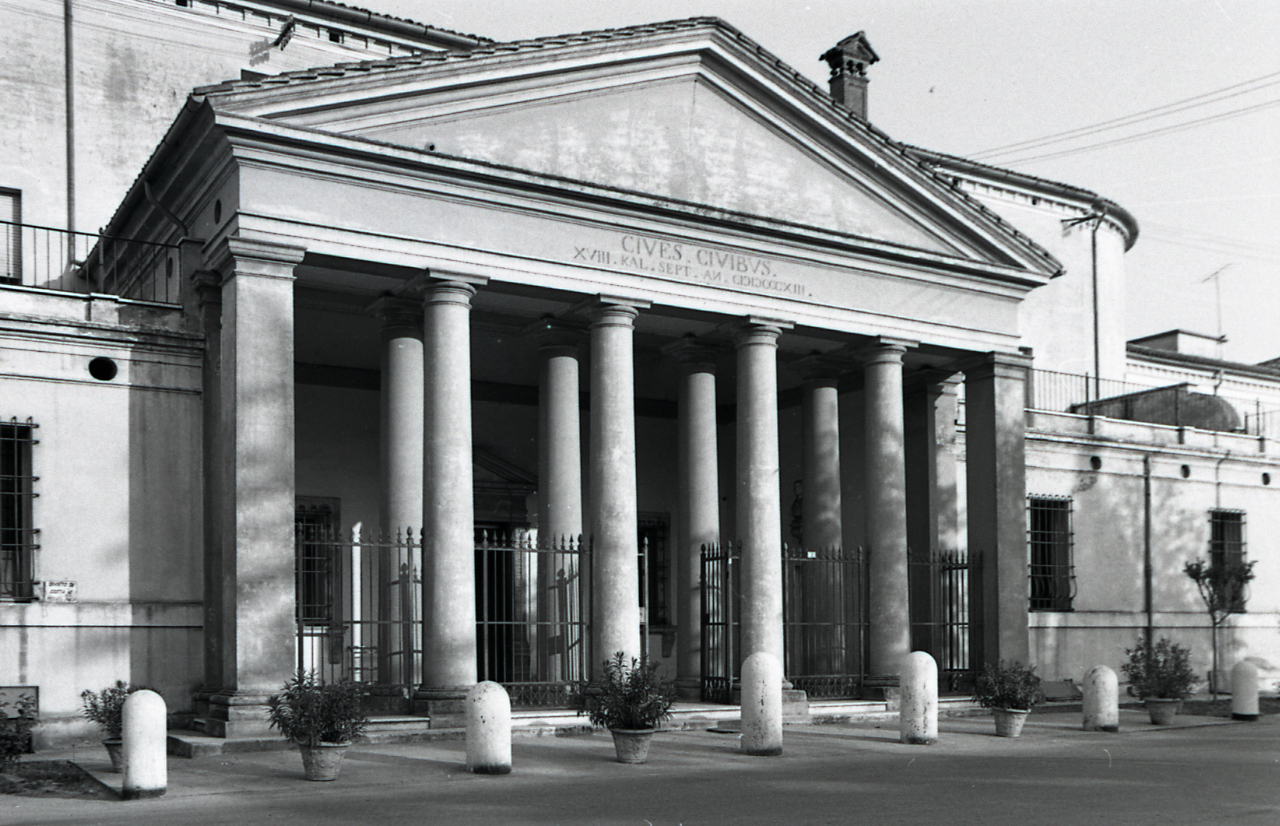
Ospedale degli Infermi, Castel Bolognese (built 1813). Photo by Paolo Monti, 1968

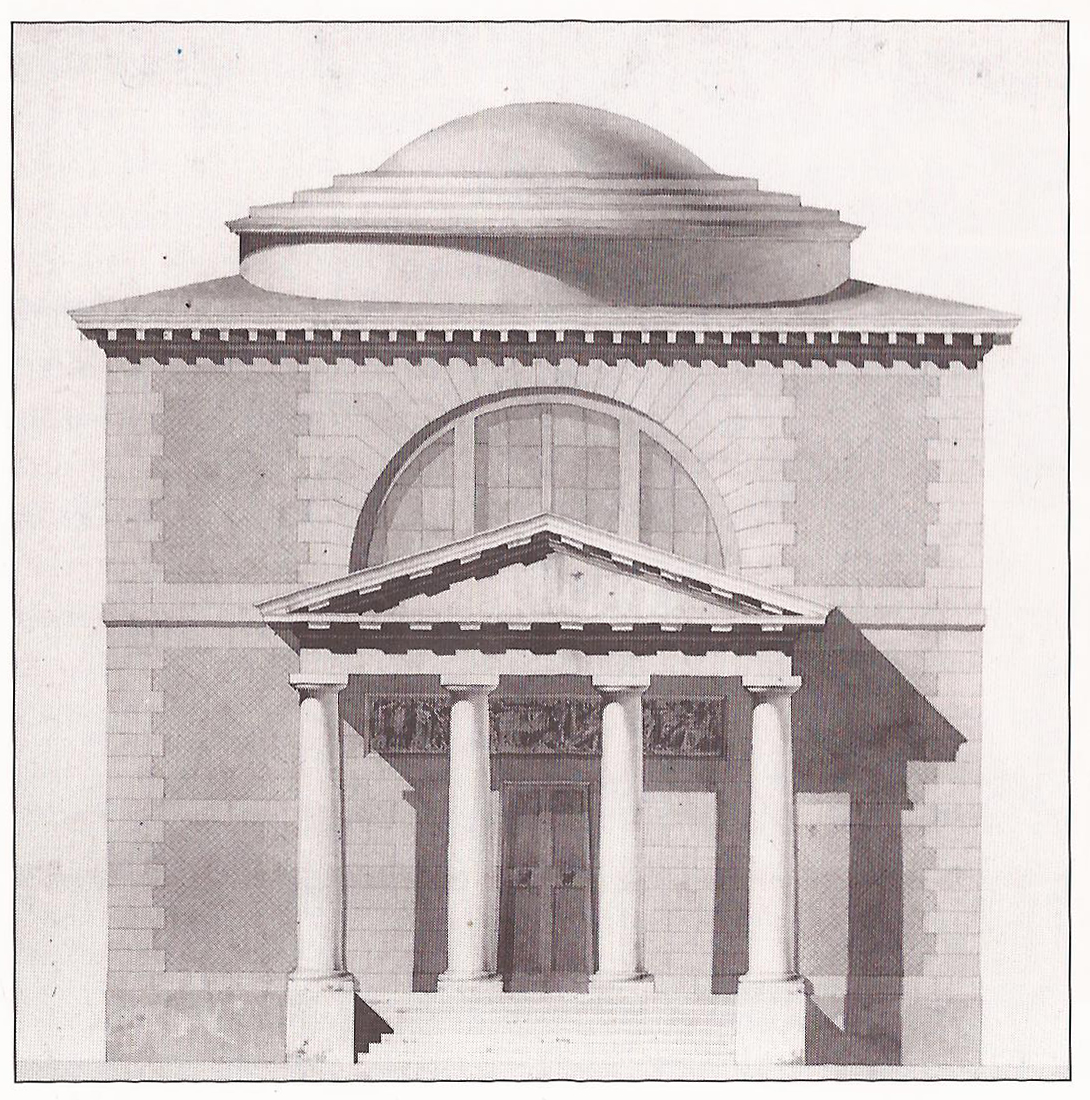
Project for the Schimmelmann Mausoleum

Plan of Foro Bonaparte (engraving by Giuseppe Caniani)

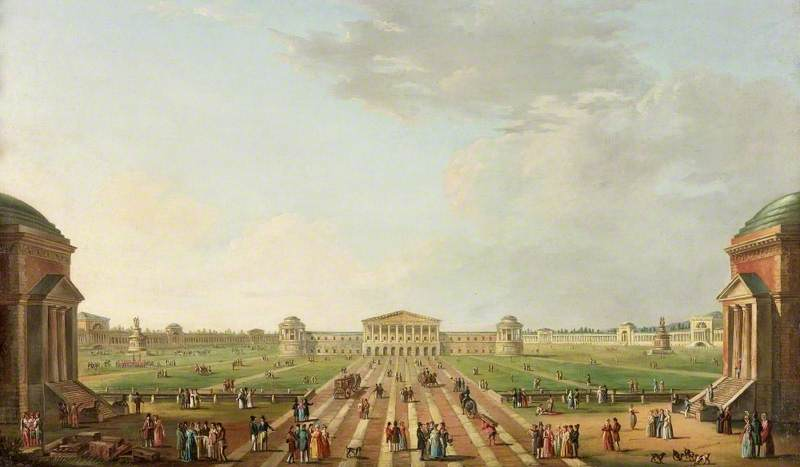
View of the projected Foro Bonaparte (engraving by Alessandro Sanquirico)

Architectural cross-section of the projected Milan stock exchange (engraving by Ferdinando Albertolli)

Architectural cross-section of the projected theatre of Milan

== Bibliography ==
- Westfall, Carroll William (1969). "Antolini's Foro Bonaparte in Milan". Journal of the Warburg and Courtauld Institutes. 32: 366–85.
- Kirk, Terry (2005). The Architecture of Modern Italy. The Challenge of Tradition 1750-1900. Vol. 1. New York: Princeton Architectural Press. pp. 92–5.
- Scotti, Aurora (2018). "Giovanni Antonio Antolini da Roma a Milano: dall'utopia della rivoluzione alla didattica per l'utopia". Utopiae finis?: percorsi tra utopismi e progetto (in Italian). Turin: Accademia University Press. pp. 81–98.
- Palmer, Allison Lee (2020). "Antolini, Giovanni Antonio". Historical Dictionary of Neoclassical Art and Architecture (2nd ed.). London: Bloomsbury Publishing PLC. pp. 26–7.
- Pepe, Mario (1961). "ANTOLINI, Giovanni Antonio". Dizionario Biografico degli Italiani (in Italian). Vol. 3: Ammirato–Arcoleo. Rome: Institute of the Italian Encyclopaedia. OCLC 883370.
