= Francesco Milizia =

Italian writer and art theorist (1725–1798)

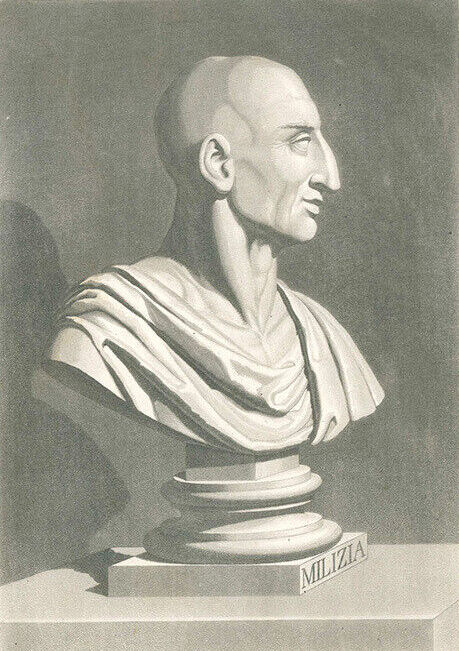
- Engraved portrait of Francesco Milizia from an edition of his Principj di architettura civile, Milan, 1832
- Born: 15 November 1725; Oria, Apulia, Kingdom of Naples
- Died: 7 March 1789 (aged 63); Rome, Papal States
- Writing career
- Language: Italian
- Period: Age of Enlightenment
- Subjects: Art theory; Architecture
- Literary movement: Neoclassicism

Francesco Milizia (15 November 1725 – 7 March 1798) was an Italian writer and art theorist. He was one of the leading Italian theorists of Neoclassicism. His writings combine neoclassical admiration for Ancient Greek art with Enlightenment rationalism and utilitarianism, showing also a taste for the expressive and the dramatic, and appreciation of Roman and Gothic art.

== Biography ==
Francesco Milizia studied in Naples, Rome and Padua, and in 1761, he settled in Rome. There he began the publication of an influential series of theoretical works, beginning with a biographical encyclopedia of architects (1768). Ferdinand IV, King of Naples, appointed him superintendent of the Farnese buildings in the Papal States, but he soon resigned this post (1780) to resume his literary career. He was friendly with José Nicolás de Azara and the painter Anton Raphael Mengs, whose art he promoted.

== Theories ==
Although Milizia advocated "great masses, great forms and great tracts" in architecture, he adopted in his works a stance that was strongly opposed to the Baroque, regarding the 16th century as an age of correctness in comparison to the 17th, which he saw as an age of corruption. He criticized St. Peter's Basilica for being divided into too many parts and denounced Michelangelo's Moses as "a horrible watchdog dressed like a stoker, badly placed and useless". Francesco Borromini's followers were categorized as "a delirious sect", while of Guarino Guarini he wrote, "whoever likes his architecture, much good may it do him, but he would be a nitwit".

Although Milizia's theories of art are not free from inconsistencies – he himself admitted that he was "a heterogeneous compound of contradictions" – his general approach was influenced by the rationalism of Carlo Lodoli and Marc-Antoine Laugier. Milizia denounced excessive ornamentation in buildings, which he considered led to the "bizzaria", destroying order and the forms dictated by Nature; nevertheless, his insistence on "soft transitions" and the avoidance of abrupt contrasts reveals the subliminal persistence of Baroque influence on his views. The functionalism that underlies Milizia's theories is clearly evident in the essay on architecture that precedes his biographical dictionary, where he enunciated principles on which perfect architecture should be based. These include symmetry and unity, combined with variety. All features should appear to be necessary and perform a specific function; hence, "everything which is done just for the purpose of decoration is vicious". The architectural orders, however, he regarded as structural rather than ornamental, although he maintained that the authority of ancient design should not be cited to impede the pursuit of reason.

Milizia's attacks helped to provoke a rejection of Baroque that persisted for a century until appreciation was rekindled by such scholars as Cornelius Gurlitt. Although Milizia implied that the legacy of Antiquity was exhausted, his writings did much to promote the rise of Neoclassicism.

== Writings ==
- Le vite de' più celebri architetti…precedute da uno saggio sopra l'architettura. Rome. 1768.
- Del teatro (Rome, 1771)
- Dell’arte di vedere nelle belle arti di disegno secondo i principi di Sulzer e di Mengs (Venice, 1781)
- Memorie degli architetti antichi e moderni (Parma, 1781)
- Principj di architettura civile (Finale, 1781)
- Dizionario delle belle arti del disegno (Bassano, 1797)

=== Works in English translation ===
- The Lives of Celebrated Architects Ancient and Modern, with Historical and Critical Observations on Their Works, and on the Principles of the Art. Translated by Eliza Taylor Cresy. 2 vols. London: J. Taylor, Architectural Library. 1826.

== Bibliography ==
- Antolini, Giovanni Antonio (1817). Osservazioni ed aggiunte ai principi di architettura civile di Francesco Milizia proposte agli studiosi ed amatori di architettura. Milan: Presso A.F. Stella.
- Schlosser, Julius von (1924). Die Kunstliteratur. Vienna: Schroll. pp. 447, 525, 580–581, 589–590.
- Ansaldi, Giulio Romano (1934). "MILIZIA, Francesco". Enciclopedia Italiana. Rome: Istituto dell'Enciclopedia Italiana.
- Kauffmann, Emil (1955). Architecture in the Age of Reason. Cambridge, MA: Harvard University Press.
- Zampetti, Pietro (1967). "Francesco Milizia: Uomo e critico d'arte". In Vittore Branca (ed.). Sensibilità e razionalità nel settecento. Vol. 2. Florence: Sansoni. pp. 675–90.
- Prozzillo, Italo (1971). Francesco Milizia teorico e storico d'architettura. Naples: Guida.
- Rykwert, Joseph (1972). On Adam's House in Paradise. New York: Museum of Modern Art.
- Lindon, John (2002). "Milizia, Francesco". The Oxford Companion to Italian Literature. Oxford: Oxford University Press.
- Sohm, Philip L. (2004). "Baroque". In Jonathan Dewald (ed.). Europe, 1450 to 1789: Encyclopedia of the Early Modern World. New York: Charles Scribner's Sons. pp. 227–30.
- Manfredi, Tommaso (2010). "MILIZIA, Francesco". Dizionario Biografico degli Italiani (in Italian). Vol. 74: Messi–Miraglia. Rome: Istituto dell'Enciclopedia Italiana. ISBN 978-88-12-00032-6.
