= Domenico Cerato =

Italian Catholic priest and architect

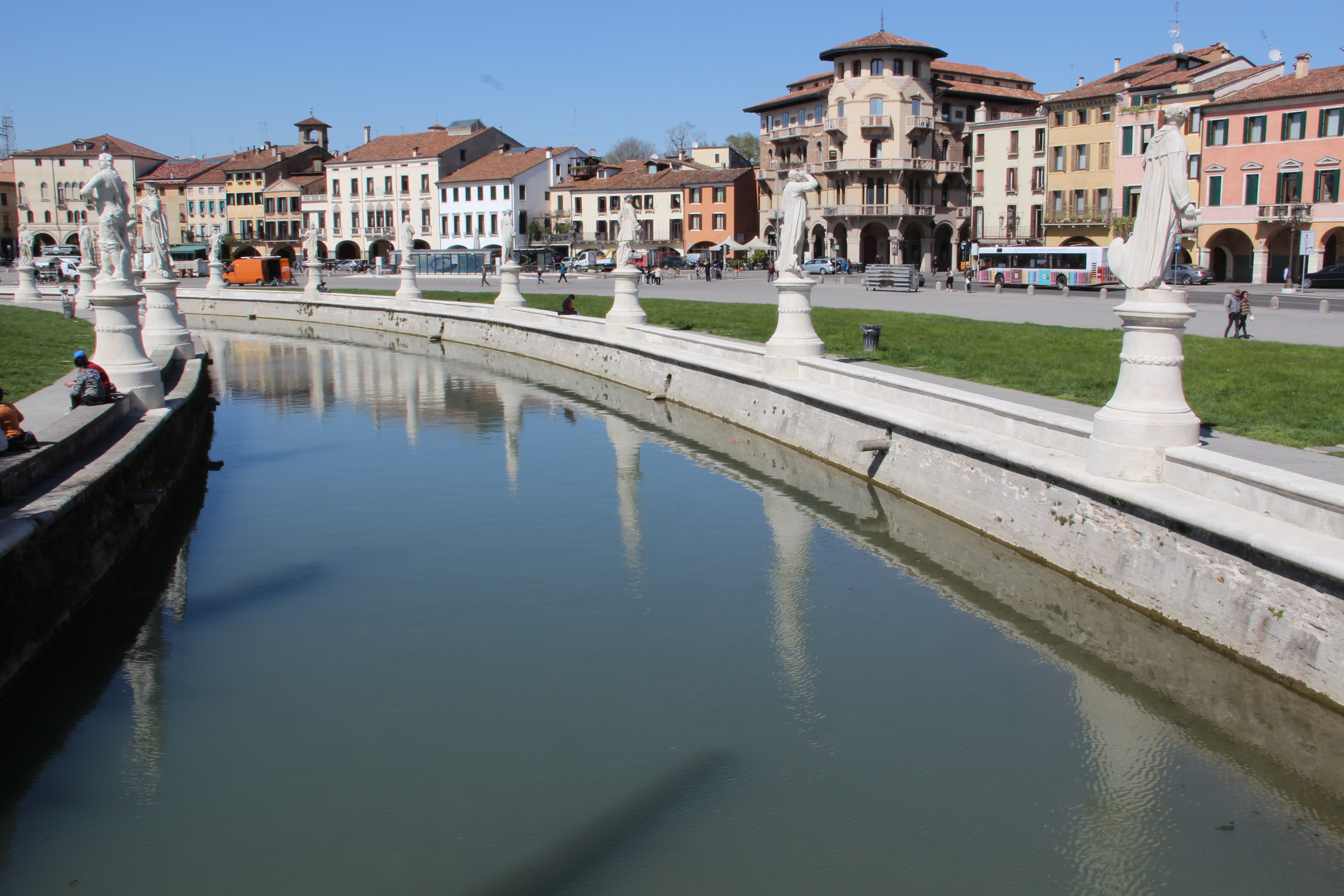
- Prato della Valle, Padua
- Born: 4 August 1715; Mason Vicentino, Republic of Venice
- Died: 30 May 1792 (aged 76); Padua, Republic of Venice
- Occupation: Architect
- Employer: University of Padua
- Movement: Neoclassicism
- Buildings: Prato della Valle

Ecclesiastical career
- Religion: Christianity
- Church: Catholic Church
- Ordained: 1738

Domenico Cerato (4 August 1715 – 30 May 1792) was an Italian architect and academic. He taught architecture for several years at Padua and converted the tower of the Castelvecchio, built as a fortress in 1232 by Ezzelino III da Romano, into an astronomical observatory.

== Biography ==
Domenico Cerato was born in 1715. He was adopted by his probable natural father, Conte Francesco Cerato Loschi, who had him educated by the Jesuits in Vicenza and from 1733 at the Padua Seminario. Although destined for a career in the church, he established a school (1748) open to young skilled workers of all social classes to teach them the fundamental rudiments of architecture within ten months. His teaching method was based on the ‘intrinsic rules of building’. At the same time his own career as an architect seems to have been devoted to minor alterations in layout and restorations in which he employed architectural solutions influenced by Palladio. He altered a doorway of the Palazzo Civena Trissino, Vicenza, and carried out alterations to the Seminario Vecchio, the church and convent of the Jesuits and the convent of San Felice, all in Vicenza. In the region of Vicenza he worked at the Villa Apolloni (now Zordan), Altavilla Vicentina, and at the Villa Piovene (now da Schio), at Castelgomberto, among others.

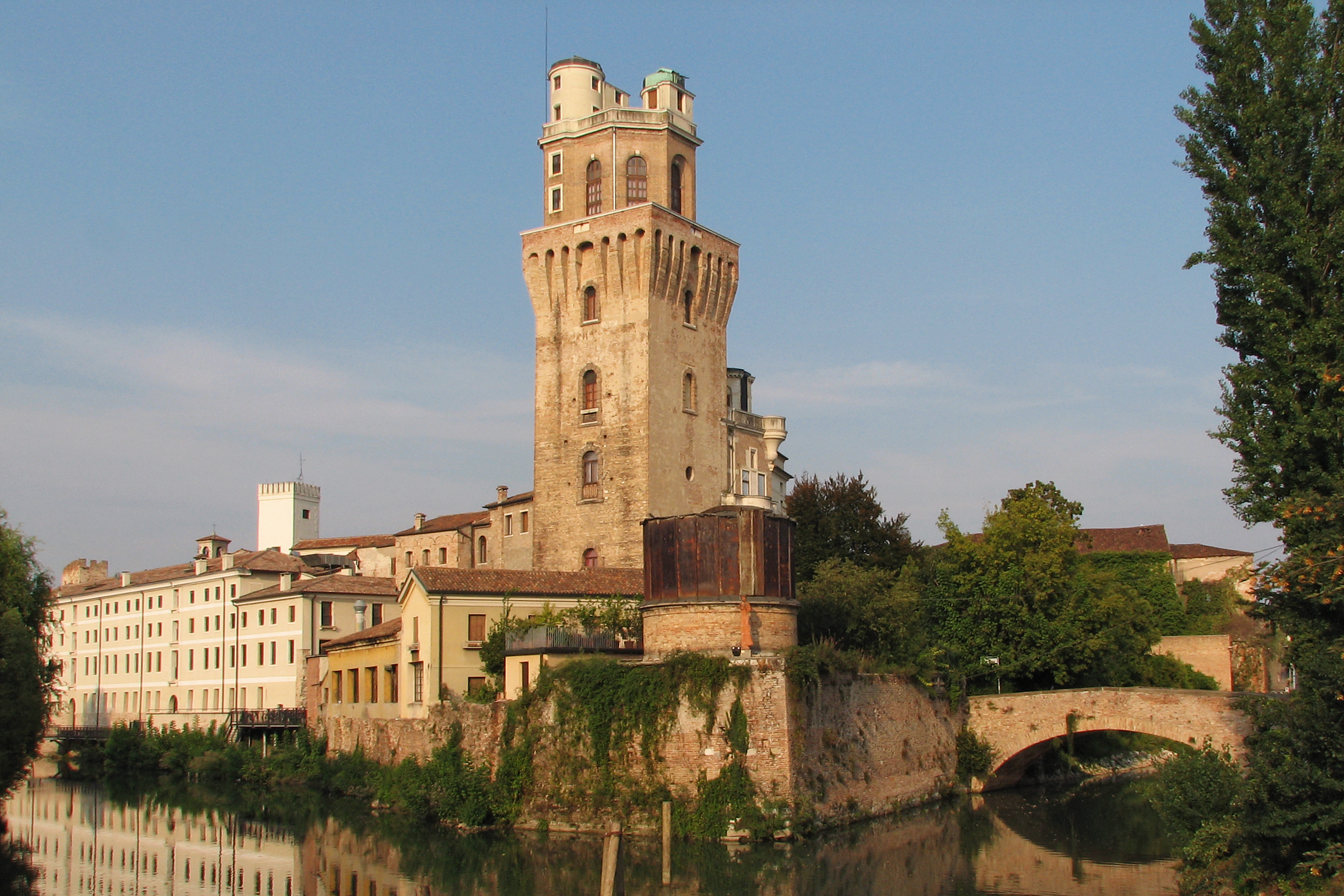
The astronomical observatory of Padua

In 1766 Cerato moved to Padua at the invitation of the astronomer Giuseppe Toaldo. In 1767 he began the conversion (completed in 1777) of the tower of the Castelvecchio, Padua, into an astronomical observatory (drawings Musei Civici di Padova). From 1769 he organized a practical school of architecture, which continued the teaching experiment already tried at Vicenza. The proposed courses included rudiments of building, mechanics and workyard techniques, which were to become fundamental for the training of architects and architect-engineers. Cerato was appointed professor of civil architecture at the University of Padua in 1771.

His school laid the foundation for the technical–professional schools of state education and played an important role in establishing the principles and trends of taste in the designing of ornaments and rules of proportion and in defining the technical roles of the labour force. The school was organized into classes of builders, carpenters and masons; in 1782 classes were added for painters and surveyors. In 1784 Cerato published a scheme of architectural exercises, Nuovo metodo per disegnare li cinque ordini di architettura civile conforme alle regole di Andrea Palladio e Vincenzo Scamozzi, in which, after providing basic information on architecture, he offered instruction in the drawing method for each of the Classical orders, for geometrical figures and for such architectural elements as doors, staircases, plans and sections.

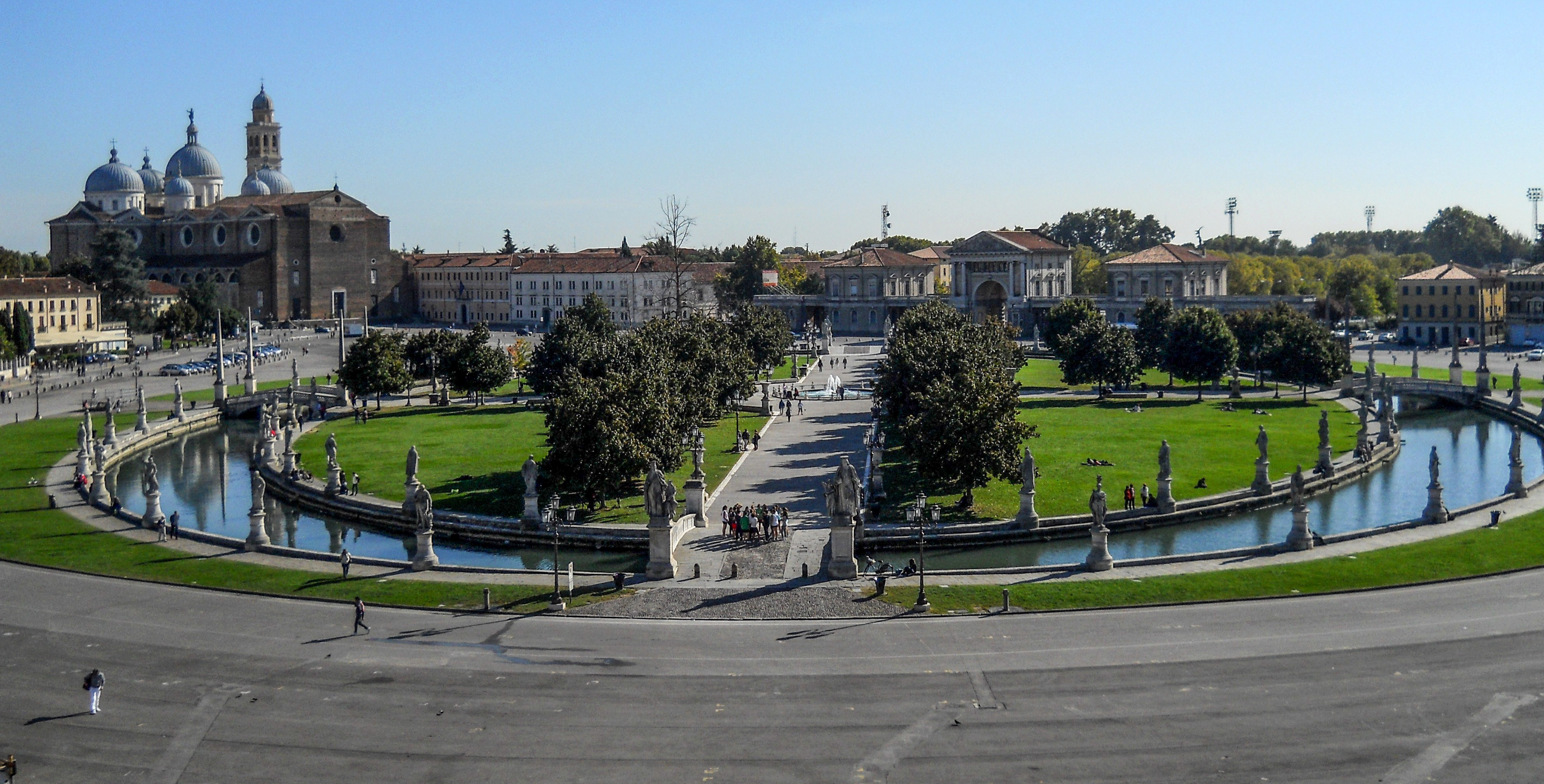
Prato della Valle

On 4 April 1773 he became a member of the Accademia Galileiana. In 1775 Andrea Memmo entrusted to him the laying out of the Prato della Valle, Padua, in its present form. The combination of a functional city square with a central oval-shaped garden, planted with trees, surrounded by a canal and decorated with statuary, including images of people associated with the history of Padua and with the University, fulfilled the concepts of Carlo Lodoli for civil architecture as a guarantor of the most rigorous functionalist principles. Cerato executed the elaborate scheme with assistance from Pietro Antonio Danieletti (1712–79), one of his pupils (drawings for the scheme survive in State Archives of Venice, Miscellanea Mappe, N. 42).

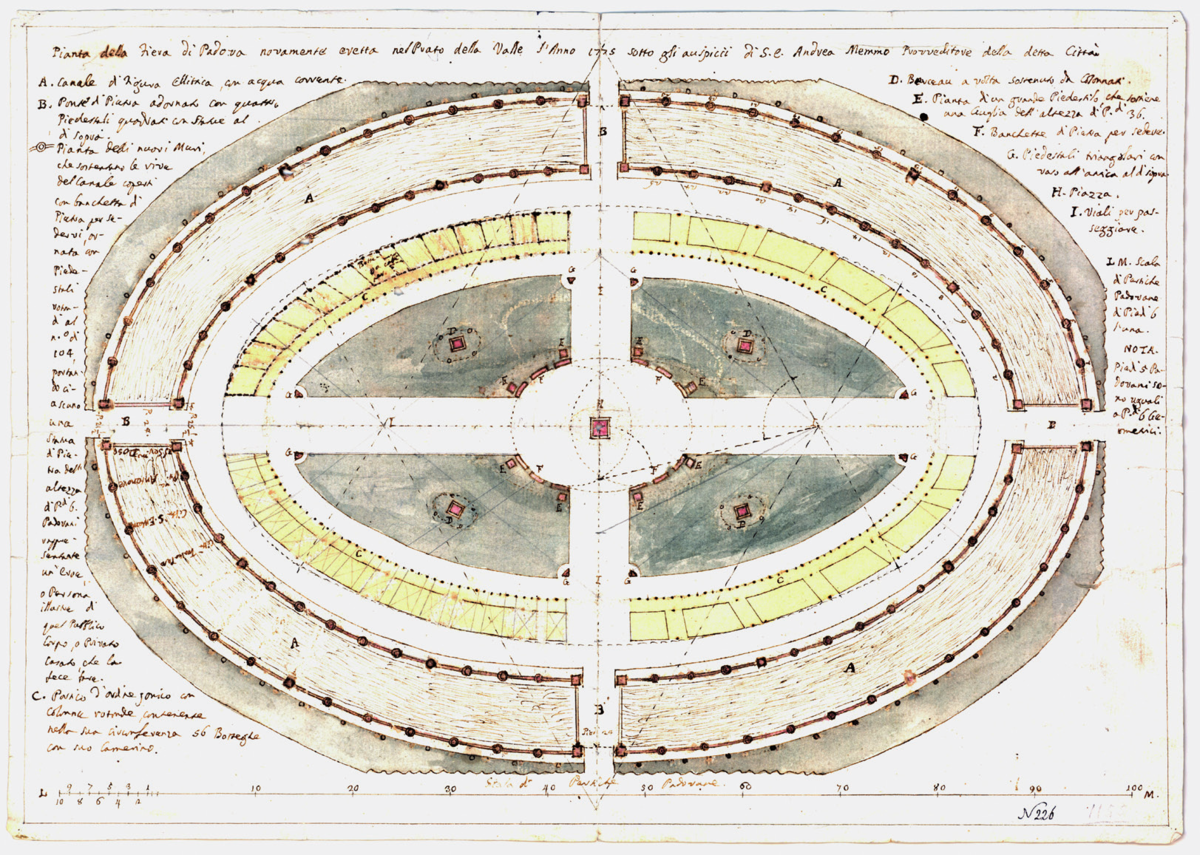
Cerato's drawings for the scheme of the Prato della Valle. Venice State Archive, Miscellanea Mappe, N. 42

Cerato worked on a similar combination of functional building with a decorative garden for Senator Angelo Querini at his Villa Altichiero, near Padua (c. 1765–c. 1785). Cerato’s small palazzo (1772) for the Parish Treasury in the courtyard of the town hall, Padua, with its combination of plain surfaces and heavy architrave mouldings, typifies the functional design advocated in his teaching. His new civic hospital of Padua (1776–98) followed the form of traditional hospitals arranged around a series of courtyards and based on examples at Milan and Lodi. The planimetric arrangement made communication between the different rooms and sections both simple and quick. Large halls for patients alternated with spacious working areas and service areas and with huge covered loggias; that in the central courtyard is arranged as a series of Serlian arcades. The external brick façade, with wide, spacious windows, is marked by a severe simplicity without any concessions to ornamentation except for stone dressing around the windows and three central bays (engraving by Danieletti of Cerato’s original scheme, Padua, Musei Civici di Padova). The building was inaugurated on March 29, 1798.

== Writings ==
- Nuovo metodo per disegnare li cinque ordini di architettura civile conforme alle regole di Andrea Palladio e Vincenzo Scamozzi. Padua: Giovanni Battista Penada. 1784.

== Bibliography ==
- Passadore, G. (1963). "Domenico Cerato architetto a Padova". Bollettino CISA. V: 318–329.
- Brunetta, G. (1976). Gli inizi dell'insegnamento pubblico dell'architettura a Padova e Venezia. Padua. pp. 21–39.
- Olivato, L. (1977). "Tradizionalismo, eversione e rinnovamento tipologico nell'edilizia tra settecento e ottocento". In L. Puppi; F. Zuliani (eds.). Padova: Case e palazzi. Vicenza. pp. 189–200.
- Barbieri, Franco (1979). "CERATO, Domenico". Dizionario Biografico degli Italiani (in Italian). Vol. 23: Cavallucci–Cerretesi. Rome: Istituto dell'Enciclopedia Italiana. ISBN 978-88-12-00032-6.
- Brusatin, M. (1980). Venezia nel settecento: Stato, architettura, territorio. Turin. pp. 271–4.
- Ericani, G. (1980). "Domenico Cerato e Angelo Querini senatore: Due disegni e alcune lettere per Altichiero". Arte Veneta. 34: 206–9.
- Lenci, A. (1981). "Il ruolo del Castelvecchio in un progetto settecentesco". Padova e la Sua Provincia. 27 (2): 3–10.
- Azzi Visentini, M. (1984). L'orto botanico di Padova e il giardino del rinascimento. Milan. p. 131.
- Bozzolato, G.; Del Negro, P.; Ghetti, C. (1986). La specola dell'Università di Padova. Padua. pp. 94–102, 149–58.
- Puppi, L. (1986). Il Prato della Valle in età moderna', Prato: Storia e arte della Valle: Due millenni di storia di un'avventura urbana. Padua. pp. 108–45.
- Brusatin, M.; Pavanello, G. (1987). Il teatro la Fenice: I progetti, l'architettura, le decorazioni. Venice. pp. 73–5.
- P. Del Negro, ed. (2015). Clariores. Dizionario biografico dei docenti e degli studenti dell'Università di Padova. Padova: Padova University Press.
- S. Zaggia; V.C. Donvito, eds. (2016). Domenico Cerato: architettura a Padova nel secolo dei lumi. Milan: Skira. ISBN 9788857234199.
