= Andrea Memmo =

Venetian politician

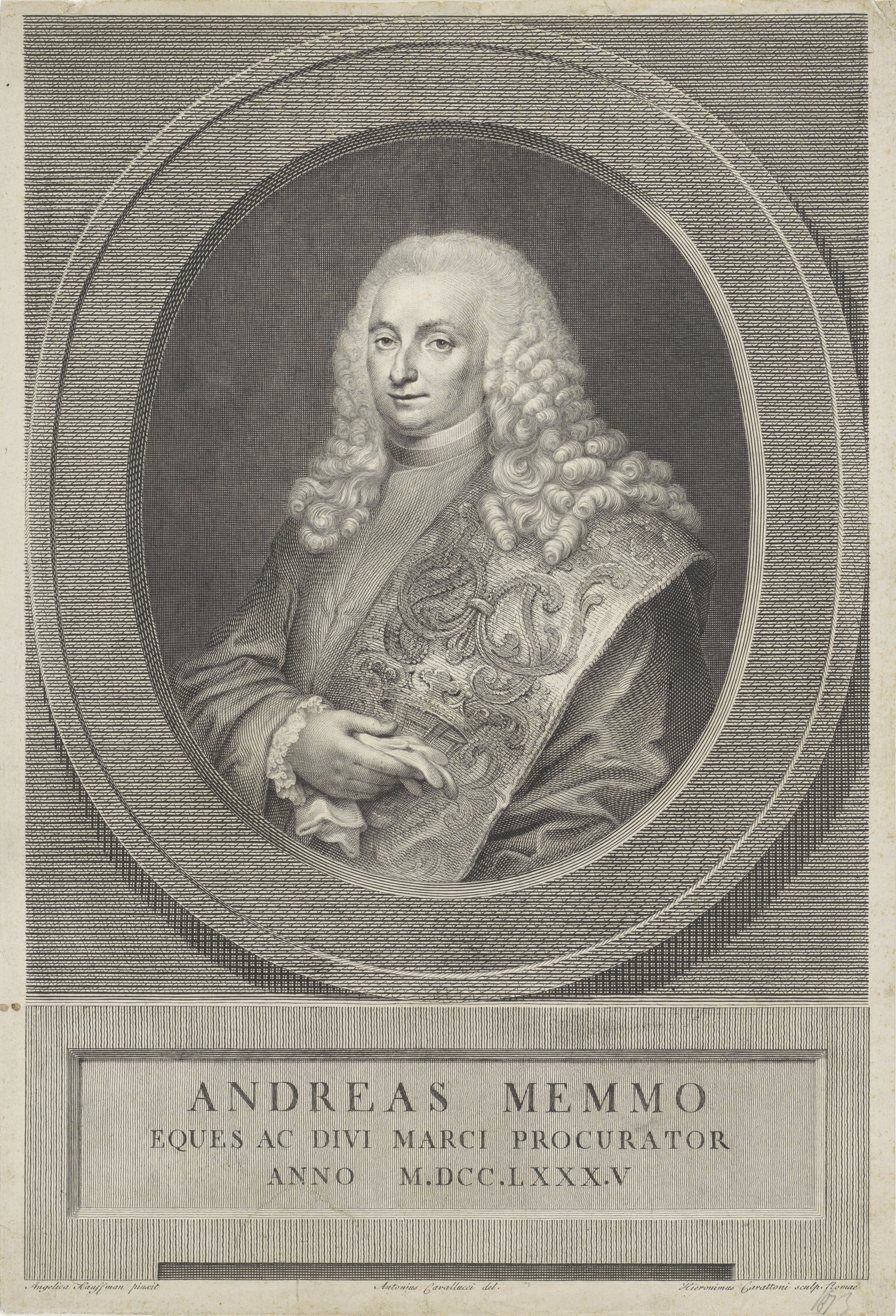
Engraving of Memmo, after a painting by Angelica Kauffmann

Andrea Memmo (29 March 1729 – 27 January 1793) was a Venetian patrician and politician. Tutored by Carlo Lodoli, he was a proponent of Enlightenment values and political reform for the stagnant Republic of Venice. He is well known for his love affair with Giustiniana Wynne, following her to Milan and Paris, before returning to Venice.

== Biography ==
Andrea Memmo came from a noble family and received a traditional and formal education from his uncle Andrea Memmo (1670–1754), which was later augmented by encounters with major intellectual figures of the age. Memmo was particularly influenced by the teaching of the monk Carlo Lodoli, from whom he acquired his passion for architecture. A close friend of Giacomo Casanova, Memmo was one of the first freemasons in Venice.

As governor of Padua (1775–6), Memmo initiated a series of projects for the urban reorganization of the city and for the functional and spatial redesign of its public buildings. This also affected the private building sector: as well as promoting repairs and reconstruction of roads and bridges and the repainting of porticos, façades, windows and balconies, he sponsored the new Civic Hospital (1776–98), which was designed by Domenico Cerato. Most importantly, he was responsible for the creation of the great Prato della Valle, a new monumental centre for fairs and commerce, which was also built by Cerato. This involved draining a vast uncultivated marshy area by digging an elliptical ditch crossed by four bridges, and adorned with 88 statues of famous men, including one of Giovanni Poleni by Antonio Canova.

He later served as Bailo of Constantinople (1777), ambassador to the Holy See (1781), and was elevated to the post of procurator of Saint Mark (1785). As Bailo of Constantinople from 1778 to 1782, Memmo arranged for the restoration and embellishment of the Embassy. It was given a Palladian porch with Ionic columns and a tympanum, and windows similar to those created by Lodoli in 1743 for San Francesco della Vigna in Venice. In 1784, while ambassador to Rome, Memmo began his Elementi d’architettura lodoliana in an effort to preserve what he could remember of Lodoli’s architectural theories. The first of Memmo’s two planned volumes was published anonymously in 1786. It was intended to lead the reader towards an understanding of the theoretical principles and conclusions that were to be contained in the second volume. The latter, however, did not appear until 1834.

In 1787, on the occasion of Memmo’s installation as Procurator of Saint Mark, he edited and published Lodoli’s Apologhi, as well as Luna d’agosto, an instructive fable modelled on those of Lodoli. In 1788 Memmo’s refutation of the criticisms levelled against Lodoli’s theories by Pietro Zaguri (1733–1804) was published in Padua, and he was supported by Lodoli’s former pupils. Memmo was interested in theatre architecture, especially during the competition (1792) for the reconstruction of the Fenice theatre in Venice. He also produced a Progetto di accademia, an unpublished work on the fine arts.

In 1789, Memmo was a candidate for the Dogeship, losing to Lodovico Manin. He died in Venice on 27 January 1793.

== Works ==
- Elementi di architettura Lodoliana, ossia l'arte di fabbricare con solidità scientifica e con eleganza non capricciosa. Rome. 1786. 2nd enlargend edition, Zara, 1833-34.
- Apologhi, immaginati, e sol estemporaneamente in voce esposti agli amici suoi dal fu fra Carlo de' Conti Lodoli. Bassano. 1787.
- La luna di agosto. Apologo postumo del P. Lodoli ... Dagli Elisj, l'anno dell'era di Proserpina 9999 M.V. Bassano. 1787.

== Sources ==
- Eickhoff, Ekkehard (2008). Venedig, spätes Feuerwerk. Glanz und Untergang der Republik, 1700–1797 [Venice, late Firework. Splendor and Downfall of the Republic, 1700–1797] (in German) (3rd ed.). Stuttgart: Klett-Cotta. ISBN 978-3-608-94145-6.
- Pasquali, Susanna (2009). "MEMMO, Andrea". Dizionario Biografico degli Italiani (in Italian). Vol. 73: Meda–Messadaglia. Rome: Istituto dell'Enciclopedia Italiana. ISBN 978-88-12-00032-6.
