= Giuseppe Barberi =

Italian architect

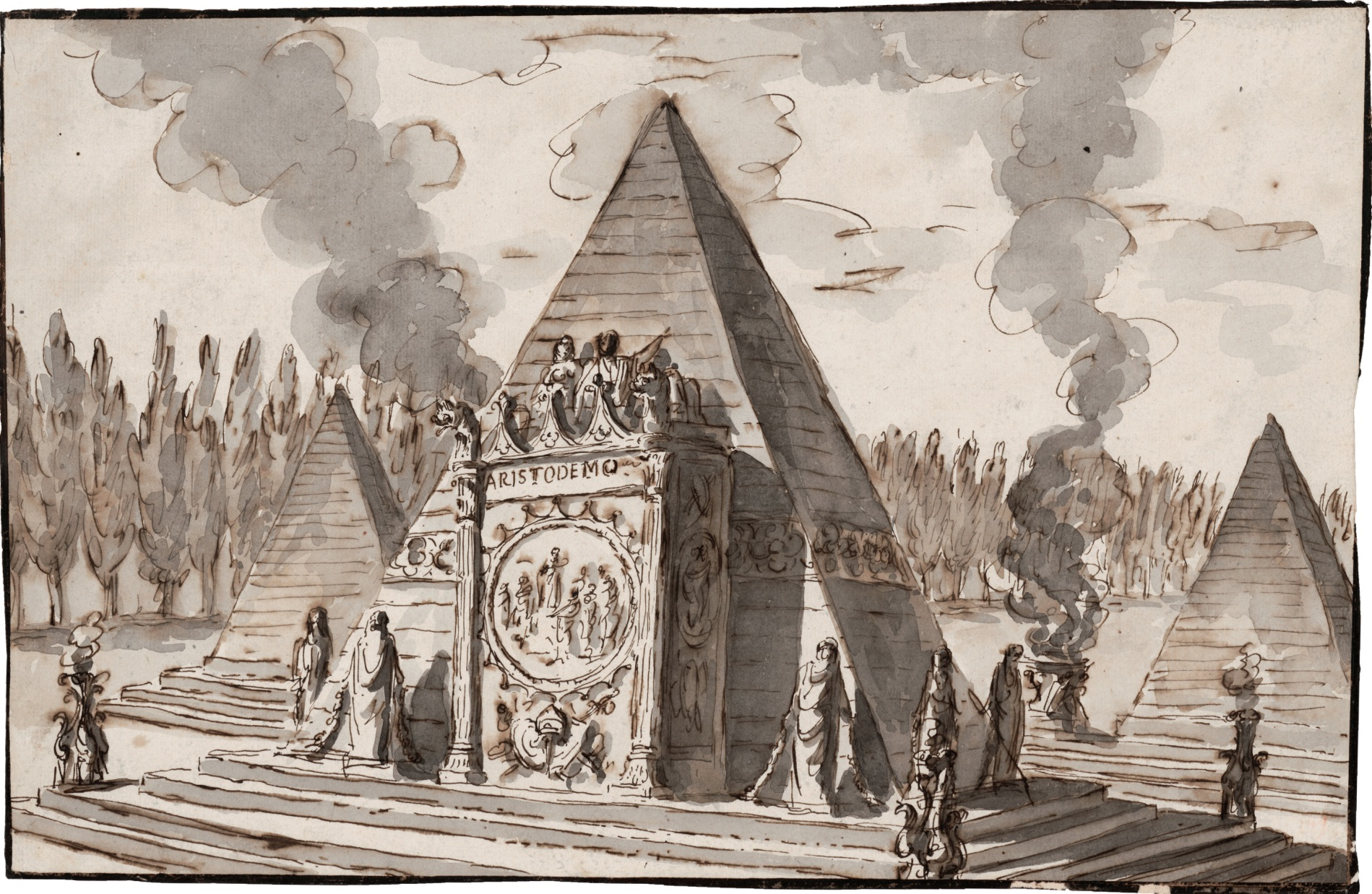
- Design for a Monument for Aristodemus
- Born: 14 January 1746; Rome, Papal States
- Died: 8 December 1809 (aged 63); Rome, Papal States
- Education: Luigi Valadier
- Occupation: Architect
- Movement: Neoclassicism

Giuseppe Barberi (14 January 1746 – 8 December 1809) was an Italian Neoclassical architect and draughtsman. Most of his architectural projects remained unexecuted.

== Biography ==
=== Early career ===
Born and raised in Rome, Barberi was first trained as a silversmith under Luigi Valadier, father of the architect, Giuseppe Valadier (1762-1839). When he was only 17 he submitted a proposal for the rebuilding of the Basilica of Maxentius and was awarded the third prize in architecture at the Accademia di San Luca.

In 1774, Barberi won the competition for the décor for the celebration of the exequies of Louis XV in the church of the French community in Rome, which gained him the patronage of the French Ambassador, Cardinal François-Joachim de Pierre de Bernis.

He worked for the Altieri family from 1775, for whom, in 1783, he built the Church of San Giorgio in Oriolo Romano and the apartment for Prince Paluzzo in his Roman palace between 1787 and 1793. In 1787, he became a member of the Accademia di San Luca. His project for Palazzo Braschi, with forty-two shops at the ground level, was criticised as inappropriate by the press. Besides the four ceremonial apartments of the family, the palace also contained eight apartments for rent.

=== Napoleonic period ===
Barberi was acquainted with Piranesi, and by his own account, the two of them founded an academy of perspective and architecture. During the French intervention in Italy (1796–1815), Barberi, who sympathised with the revolutionary ideology, left Rome for Milan (1798). Following the French occupation of the Papal States, he returned to Rome, where he was appointed architect to the Roman Republic. In 1798, he designed an ephemeral triumphal arch for the Festa della Federazione in Rome, which was erected near the Ponte Sant'Angelo and is recorded in a painting by Felice Giani in the Palazzo Braschi. The round pedestal, decorated with a series of standing figures carved in relief on top of the arch, probably refers to Ennemond Alexandre Petitot's triumphal arch from the late 1740s. After the fall of the republic, Barberi fled to France. In 1800, he worked briefly in the Paris studio run by Piranesi's son Francesco. In 1806, he returned to Rome, where he died on 8 December 1809.

== Works ==
Although Barberi was admitted to the Accademia di San Luca as an architect, there are few buildings which can be associated with his name. His sketchbooks, however, show that he was constantly designing projects of every description. While the grandeur and ornamentation of his buildings and the large dimensions of his urban designs showed acquaintance with the work of Giovanni Antonio Antolini and of Felice Giani, he also reminded contemporaries of the work of Francesco Borromini. According to Ada Louise Huxtable:

The concepts of Barberi are already closer to the austerities of the romantic classicism that produced the overscaled, surreal stylography of Ledoux and Boullée. But But what is later pushed to the monumentally macabre by those French architects is full of light and motion in Barberi's sketches; his facile use of pen and brush infuses the massive subjects with a joyful vitality.

== Legacy ==
His work is held in several museums, including the Cooper-Hewitt, National Design Museum, the University of Michigan Museum of Art, the Morgan Library & Museum, and the Metropolitan Museum of Art.

== Gallery ==
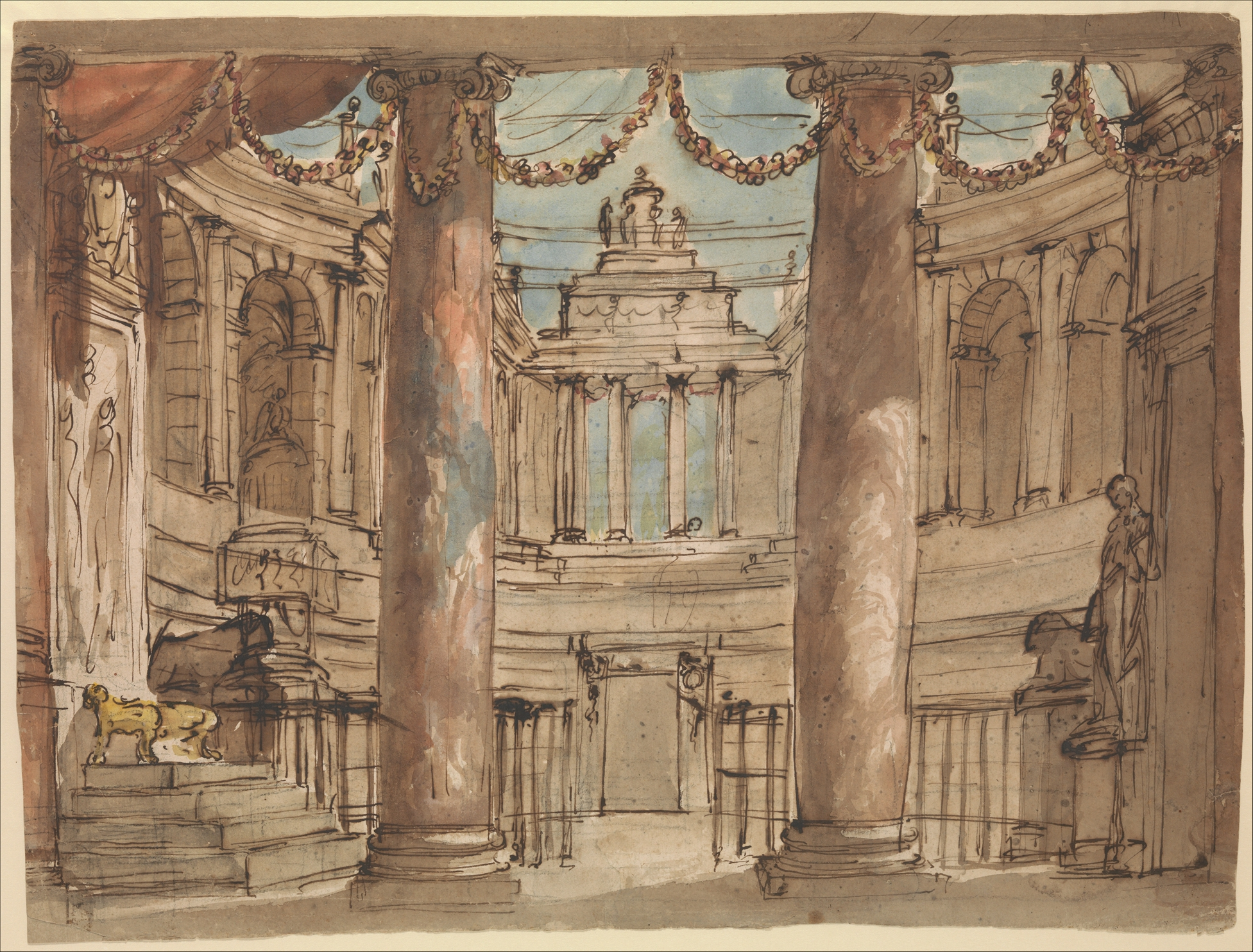
Design for a Stage Set, Metropolitan Museum of Art, New York

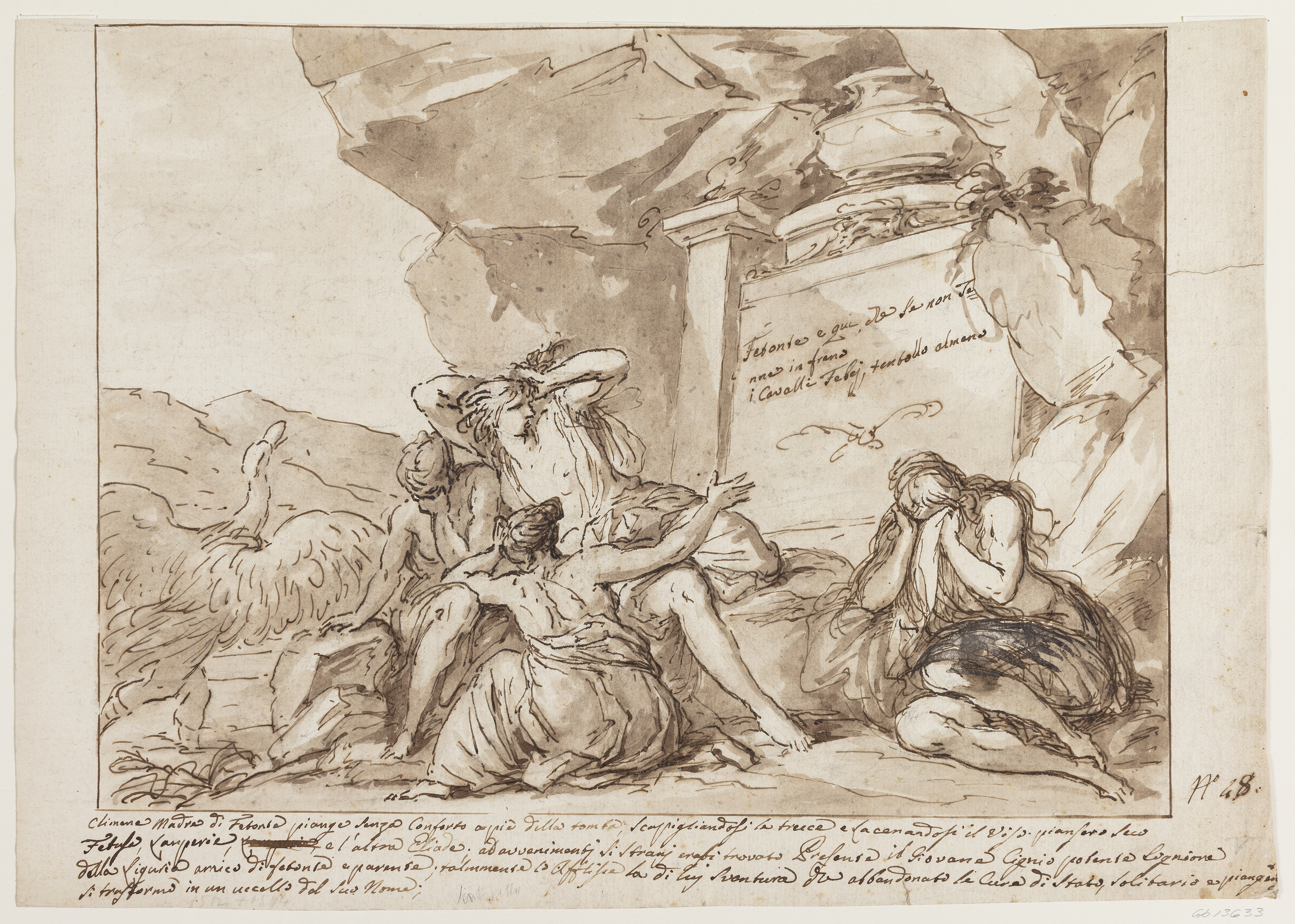
Lamenting women in front of a sarcophagus, National Gallery of Denmark, Copenhagen

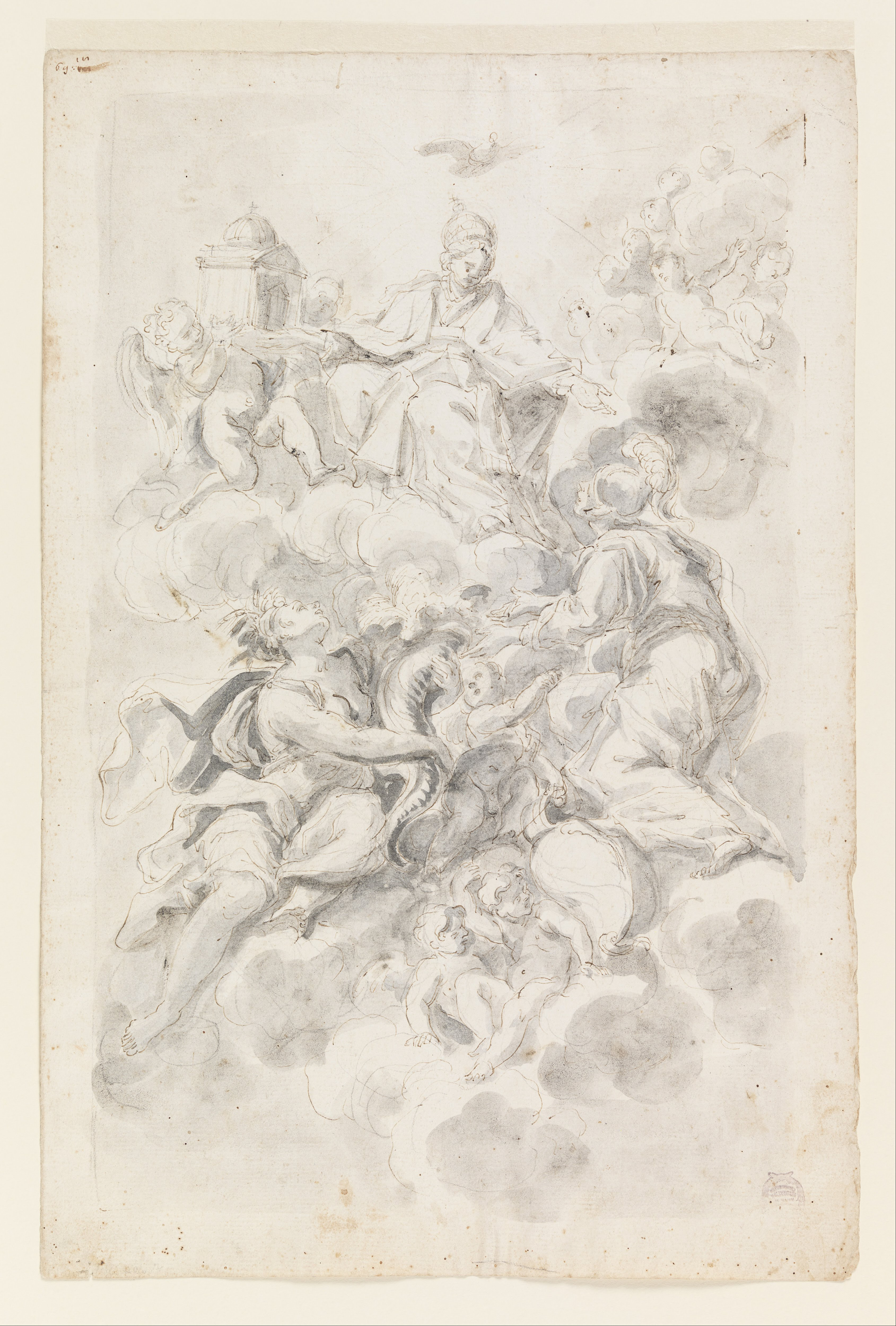
Design for a Doorcase, Cooper Hewitt, Smithsonian Design Museum, New York

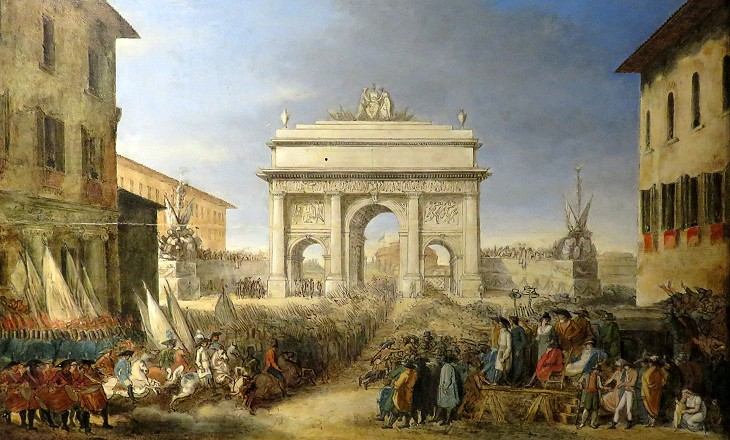
Ephemeral arch erected in Piazza di Ponte to celebrate the Roman Republic on March 20, 1798. Painting by Felice Giani
