= Prato della Valle =

Square in Padua, Italy

Coordinates: 45°23′54″N 11°52′33″E

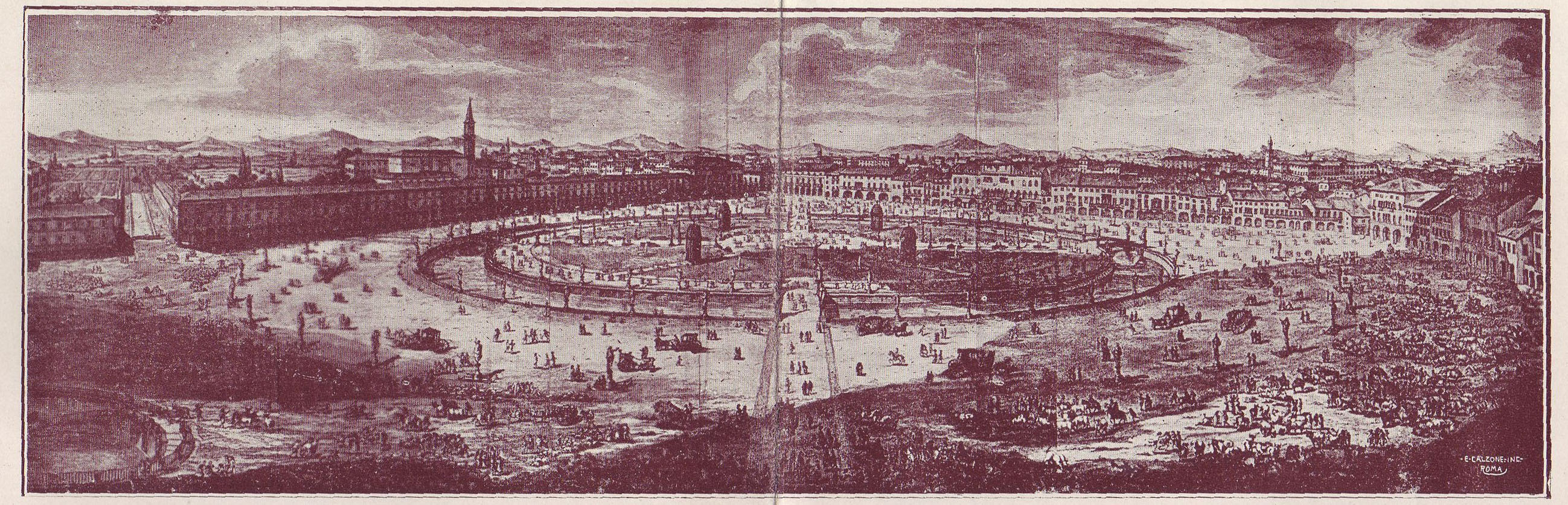
Padova – Prato della Valle – Engraving by F. Piranesi (c. 1785). (Note: At the bottom of Piranesi's engraving, one can read the following descriptive text: Prospectus of the new square following the general idea already conceived and in large part implemented by his Excellency Mr. Andrea Memmo Cavaliere and Procurator of S. Marco when he was extraordinary provider of the Serene Republic of Venice, between the years MDCCLXXV and VI. Above marshy terrain containing the space of 974,012 square geometric feet and called therefore the square of the valley, the island destined for public walks, art museums and statues which adorn it proudly with figures of merchants and animals, indication of spectacular woods, lakes, streets, bridges and many other ornaments which can be discovered without explanation.)

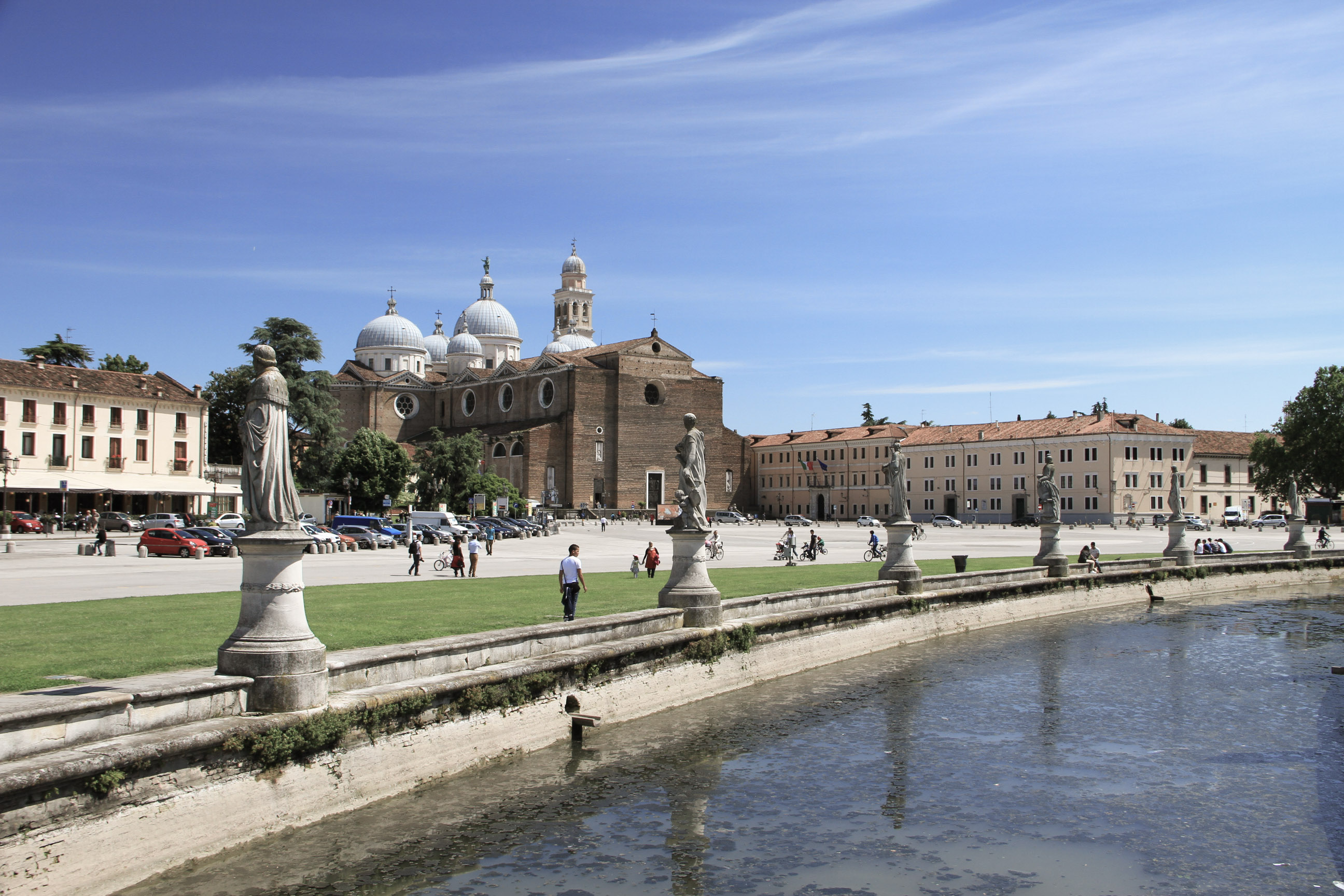
Prato della Valle, Abbey of Santa Giustina on the middle in the background

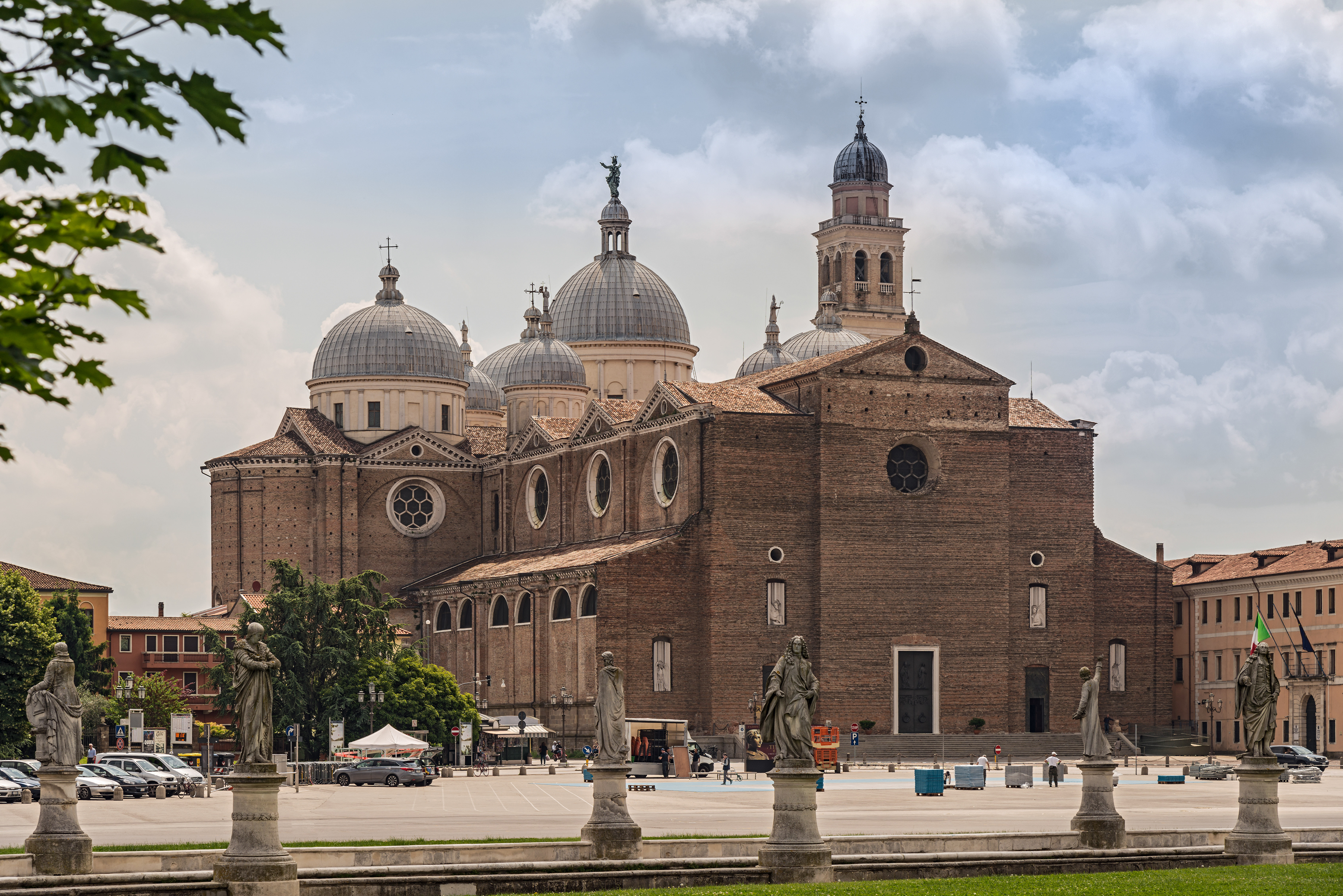
The Abbey of Santa Giustina as seen from the Prato.

Prato della Valle (Prà de ła Vałe in Venetian) is a 90,000-square-meter elliptical square in Padua, Italy. It is the second largest square in Italy and one of the largest in Europe. Today, the square is a large space with a green island at the center, l'Isola Memmia, surrounded by a small canal bordered by two rings of statues.

== History ==
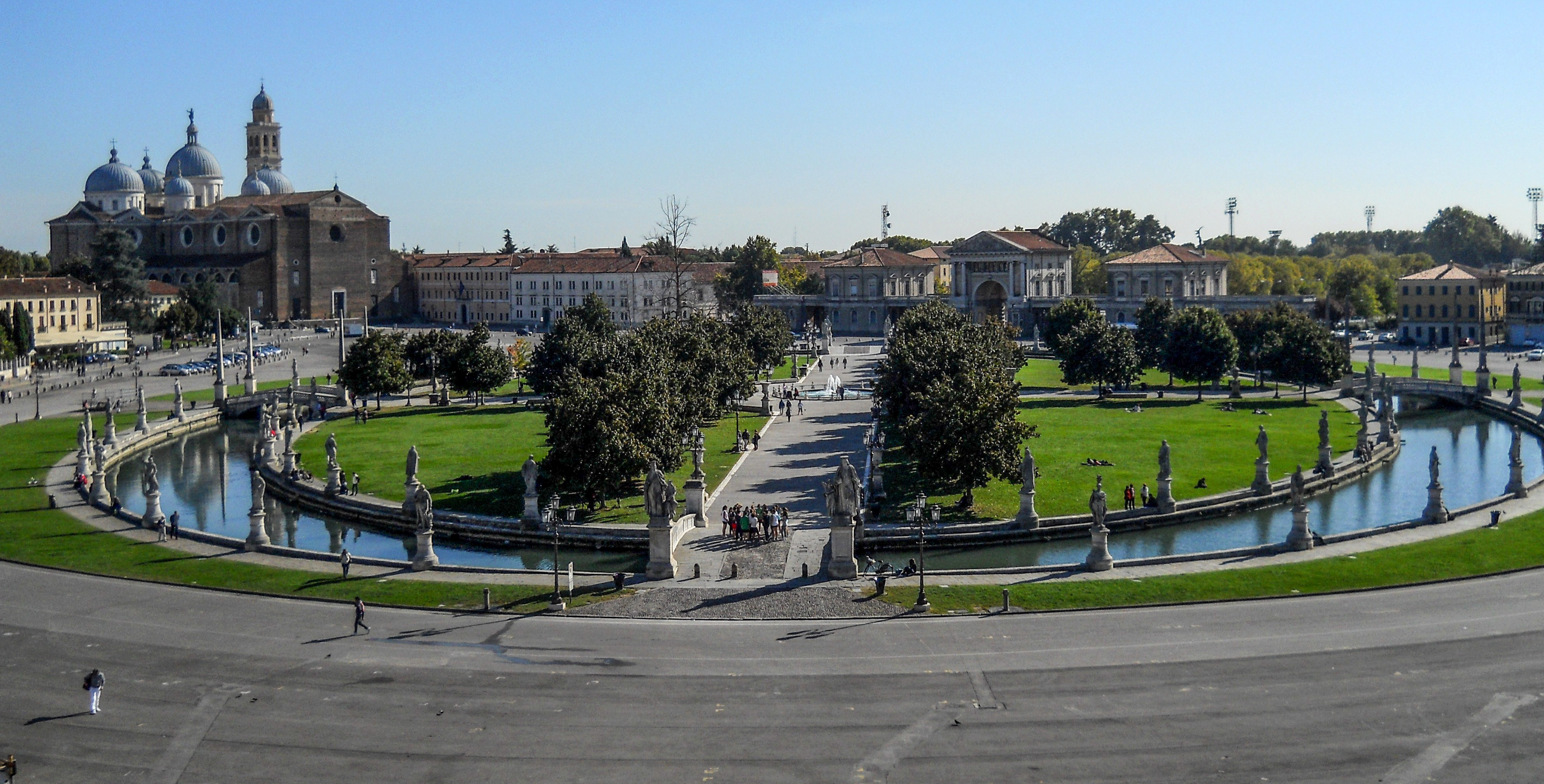
Panorama

Prior to 1635, the area that would come to be known as the "Prato della valle" was largely a featureless expanse of partially swampy terrain just south of the old city walls of Padova. In 1636, a group of Venetian and Veneto notables financed the construction of a temporary but lavishly appointed theater as a venue for mock battles on horseback. The musical entertainment that served as the prologue to the jousting is considered to be the immediate predecessor of the first public opera performances in Venice, which began the following year.

In 1767, the square, which belonged to the monks of Santa Giustina, became the public property of the city of Padua. In 1775, Andrea Memmo, whose statue is in the square, decided to reclaim and restructure the entire area. The entire project, which was never fully completed, is represented in a famous copper engraving by Francesco Piranesi from 1785. It seems that Memmo commissioned this and other representations and kept them on exhibition at the Palazzo Venezia, the headquarters of the Embassy of the Republic in Rome. He did this in order to entice other important figures into financing the construction of statues to decorate the square. The project was approved by Domenico Cerato, professor of architecture at Vicenza and Padova.

The preliminary excavations done to install the plumbing system and reclaim the area were directed by Simone Stratico. These excavations brought to light the remains of an ancient Roman theater. These findings conferred a sense of historical dignity on the initiative and transformed it into a project of reclamation for its natural public use. Andrea Memmo resided at Palazzo Angeli, constructed in the 15th century and located in Prato della Valle at an angle with the avenue Umberto I. Today, the monumental palazzo, the property of the city of Padova, hosts the Museum of Precinema, Minici Zotti Collection.

Of particular interest are the Benedictine Abbey of Santa Giustina, the neoclassical style Loggia Amulea, and the many interesting palazzi constructed between the 14th and the 18th centuries that surround the square.

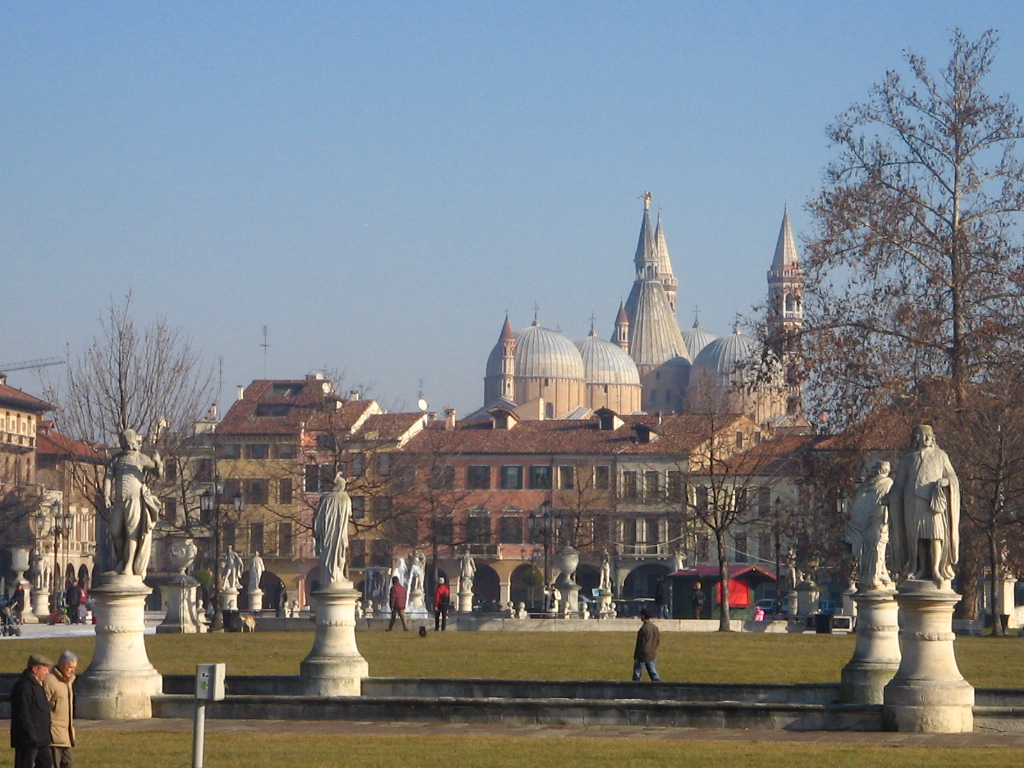
Prato della Valle with a view of the Basilica of Saint Anthony of Padua.

== Prato della Valle today ==
Prato della Valle has long been dear to the hearts of Paduans, who often simply refer to it as Il Prato. At various times, it was also known as the valley without grass, because the shade of trees prevented much grass from growing there. Today, however, it is completely covered with grass and other vegetation.

During the 1990s, the Prato went through a period of degradation and neglect, but today it has been restored through reclamation projects organized by a group of Padua's concerned citizens. During the summer, the square is alive with large numbers of visitors who skate, stroll, or study while basking in the sun. Summer evenings are marked by the presence of teenagers and young adults who chat until the early hours of the morning.

For several years running, the Prato della Valle has hosted the Paduan section of the Festivalbar, and has also played host to skating competitions that have availed themselves of the wide, paved ring that surrounds the square.

Every New Year's Day, and during the Feast of the Assumption in mid August, parties with music and fireworks take place in the Prato.

The monumental 15th century building of the Palazzo Angeli, belonging to the City of Padova and once the home of Andrea Memmo, hosts the Museum of Precinema – Minici Zotti Collection.

== Statues ==
Today there are 78 statues (40 in the exterior ring and 38 statues in the inner ring); following the original plan, there had been 88 statues. They were made from stone of Vicenza between 1775 and 1883 by various artists. One of the statues represents Andrea Memmo, the patrician Venetian known as the provider of Padova.

The numeration follows the sculpted numbers on the base of the statues.

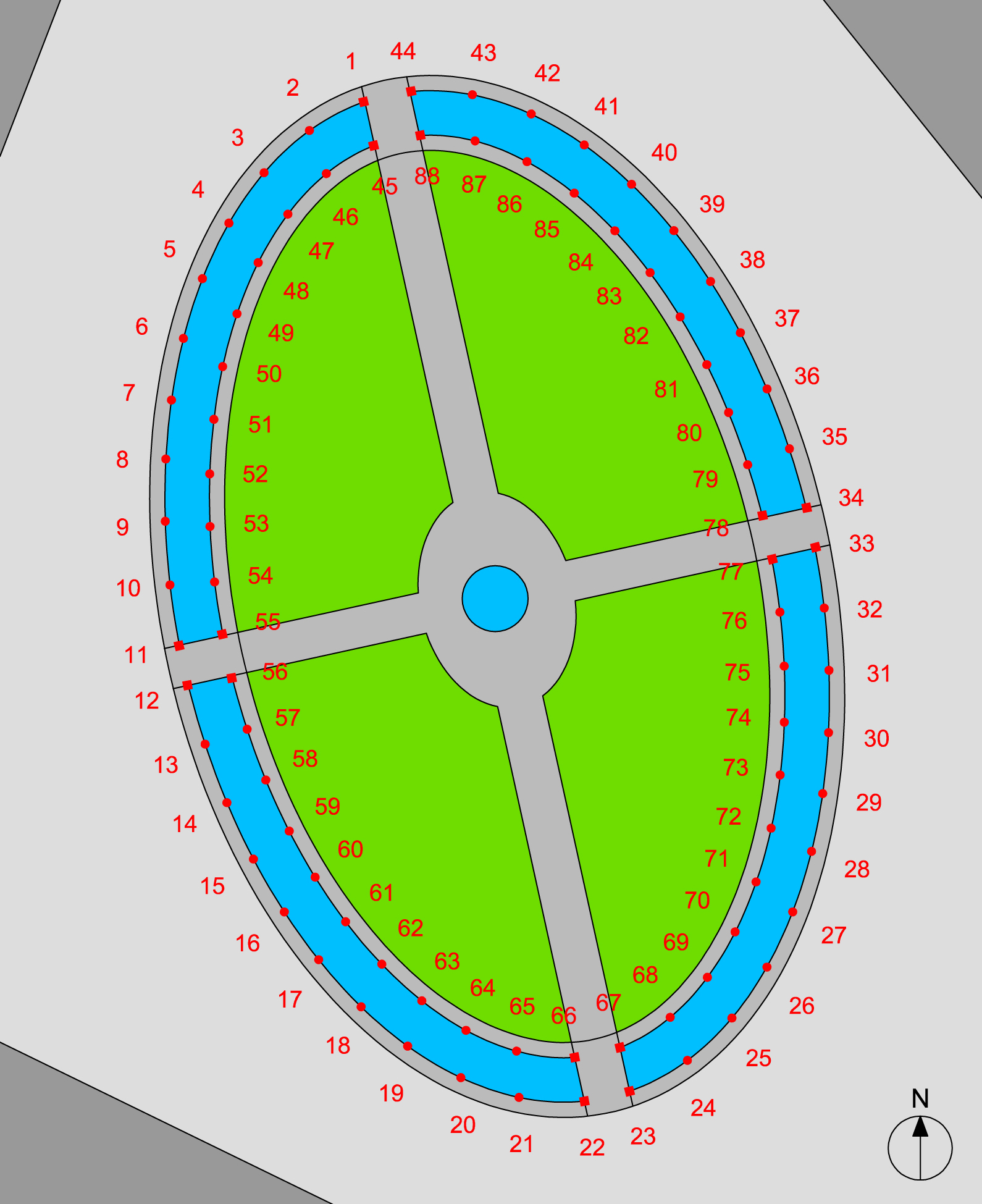
Plan with numeration of the statues

Exterior ring

- 01 Antonio Diedo
- 02 Antenor
- 03 Albert Azzo II
- 04 Publius Clodius Thrasea Paetus
- 05 Torquato Tasso
- 06 Pietro D'Abano
- 07 Giovanni Francesco Mussato
- 08 Pagano Della Torre
- 09 Lucio Arunzio Stella
- 10 Opsicella
- 11 (Obelisk)
- 12 (Obelisk)
- 13 Bernardo Nani
- 14 Vettor Pisani
- 15 Lodovico Sambonifacio
- 16 Antonio Michiel
- 17 Antonio Barbarigo
- 18 Domenico Lazzarin
- 19 Taddeo Pepoli
- 20 Marco Mantova Benavides
- 21 Andrea Mantegna
- 22 Pope Paul II (Pietro Barbo)
- 23 Pope Eugene IV (Gabriele Condulmer)
- 24 Bernardino Trevisan
- 25 Antonio da Rio
- 26 Andrea da Recanati
- 27 Ludovico Ariosto
- 28 Albertino Mussato
- 29 Giuseppe Tartini (with Francescantonio Vallotti)
- 30 Giovanni Maria Memmo
- 31 Michele Morosini
- 32 Melchiorre Cesarotti
- 33 (Obelisk)
- 34 (Obelisk)
- 35 Petrach (Francesco Petrarca)
- 36 Galileo Galilei
- 37 Alessandro Orsato
- 38 Alteniero degli Azzoni
- 39 Sicco Polenton
- 40 Antonio Zacco
- 41 Cesare Piovene
- 42 Maffeo Memmo
- 43 Andrea Navagero
- 44 Andrea Memmo

Inner ring

- 45 (Empty pedestal)
- 46 Zambono Dotto de' Dauli
- 47 Sperone Speroni
- 48 Titus Livius (Livy)
- 49 Gerolamo Savorgnan
- 50 Fortunio Liceti
- 51 Lodovico Buzzuccarini
- 52 Giovanni Poleni
- 53 Guglielmo Malaspina degli Obizzi
- 54 Giovanni Dondi dell'Orologio
- 55 (Obelisk)
- 56 (Obelisk)
- 57 Antonio Schinella de' Conti
- 58 Jacopino de' Rossi
- 59 Gustavo Adamo Baner
- 60 Gustavus Adolphus of Sweden
- 61 Matteo de' Ragnina
- 62 Hiob Ludolf
- 63 Stefano Gallini
- 64 Filippo Salviati
- 65 Oberto Pallavicino
- 66 Pope Alexander VIII (Pietro Ottoboni)
- 67 Pope Clement XIII (Carlo Rezzonico)
- 68 Antonio Canova (with the procurator Antonio Capello)
- 69 Francesco Luigi Fanzago
- 70 Francesco Pisani
- 71 Giulio Pontedera
- 72 Nicolò Tron
- 73 Francesco Guicciardini
- 74 Jacopo Menochi
- 75 John III Sobieski
- 76 Stephen Báthory
- 77 (Obelisk)
- 78 (Obelisk)
- 79 Pietro Danieletti (with Gianbattista Morgagni)
- 80 Rainiero Vasco
- 81 Francesco Morosini
- 82 Gerolamo Liorsi
- 83 Antonio Savonarola
- 84 Marino Cavalli
- 85 Andrea Briosco (with Gaspara Stampa)
- 86 Albertino Papafava
- 87 Michele Savonarola
- 88 (Empty pedestal)

Statues of Venetian Doges, destroyed by Napoleon in 1797:

- Antonio Grimani
- Marcantonio Giustinian
- Alvise Mocenigo
- Marcantonio Memmo
- Francesco Morosini, also known as "il Peloponnesiaco" (Note: The present statue, number 81, was made after 1797 and Morosini is represented as an ancient Roman hero instead of the Doge of Venice)

== Bibliography ==
- Pierluigi Petrobelli." L'Ermiona di Pio Enea Obizzi ed i primi spettacoli d'opera venetiani" in La nuova musicologica italiana, Torino, Einaudi, 1965 (Quaderni della rassegna musicale, 3)
- Prosdocimi, Aldo. Il Prato della Valle, Padova. 1978.
- Stratico, Simone. Dell'antico teatro di Padova, Padova, 1795.
- Stefano Zaggia. Isoletta sacra al commercio ed all’arti". Andrea Memmo, Melchiorre Cesarotti e il Prato della Valle come esperimento di riforma del paesaggio urbano, in Melchiorre Cesarotti e le trasformazioni del paesaggio europeo, a cura di F. Finotti, Trieste, EUT, 2010, pp. 112–128. http://hdl.handle.net/10077/4458
