= Museum of Precinema =

Museum in Italy

Coordinates: 45°23′54″N 11°52′33″E

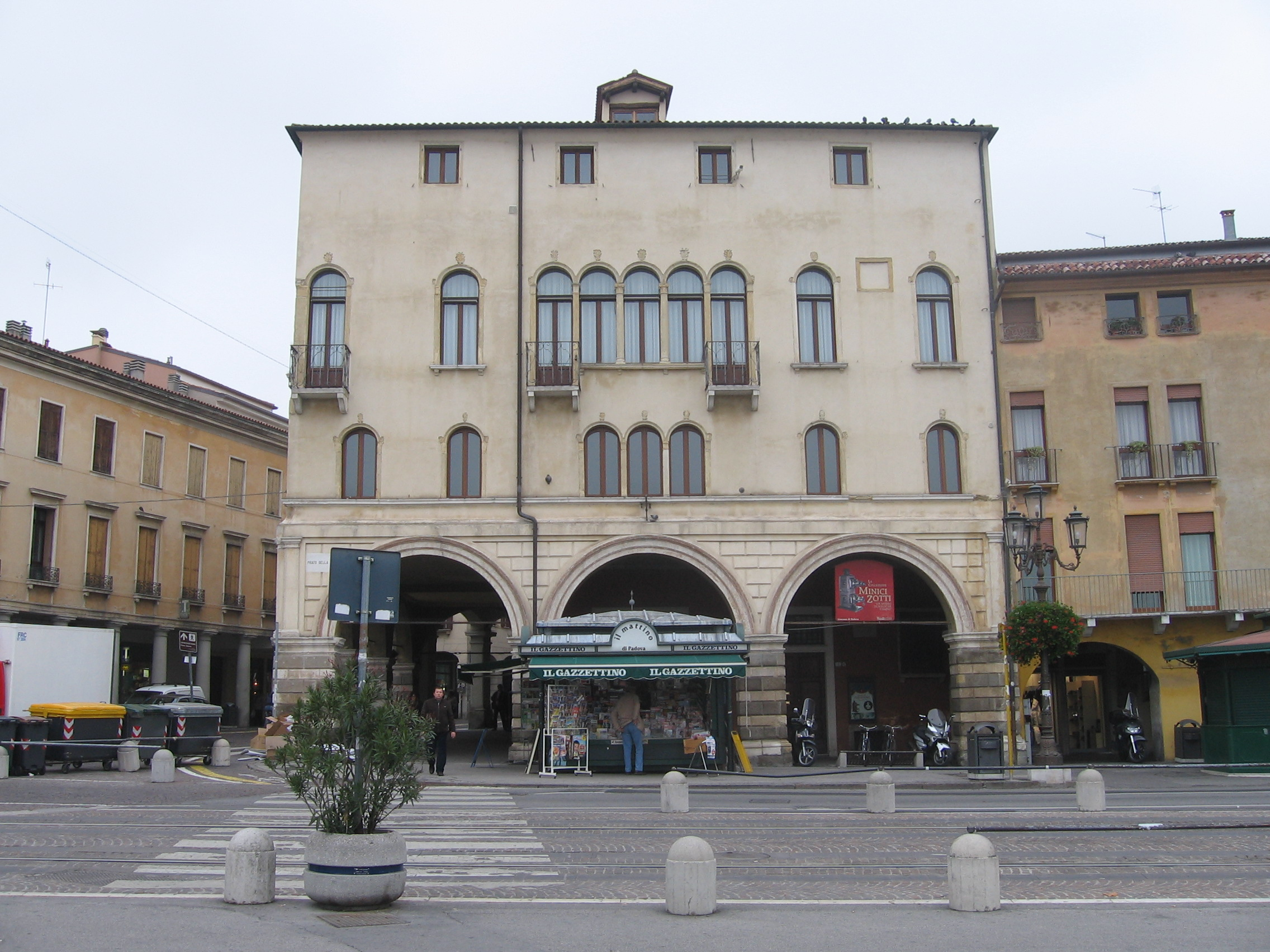
The Palazzo Angeli, that houses the Museum of Precinema.

The Museum of Precinema (in Italian: Museo del Precinema) is a museum in the Palazzo Angeli, Prato della Valle, Padua, Italy, related to the history of precinema, or precursors of film. It was created in 1998 to display the Minici Zotti Collection, in collaboration with the Comune di Padova. It also produces interactive touring exhibitions and makes valuable loans to other prestigious exhibitions such as 'Lanterne magique et film peint' at the Cinémathèque Française in Paris and the Museum of Cinema in Turin.

== Palazzo Angeli ==
The museum is housed on the top floor of the 15th-century Palazzo Angeli. In the 18th century, the building was home to Andrea Memmo, adviser and attorney to the Republic of Venice. He was also the benefactor of Padua responsible for transforming the marshy wasteland of Prato della Valle into a monumental piazza and the largest square in Italy. His friend Giacomo Casanova was once a guest at the Palazzo Angeli, and it was from the viewpoint of the building's windows that Canaletto etched his panoramic view of the Prato in the mid-eighteenth century using a camera obscura.

== Collezione Minici Zotti (The Minici Zotti Collection) ==
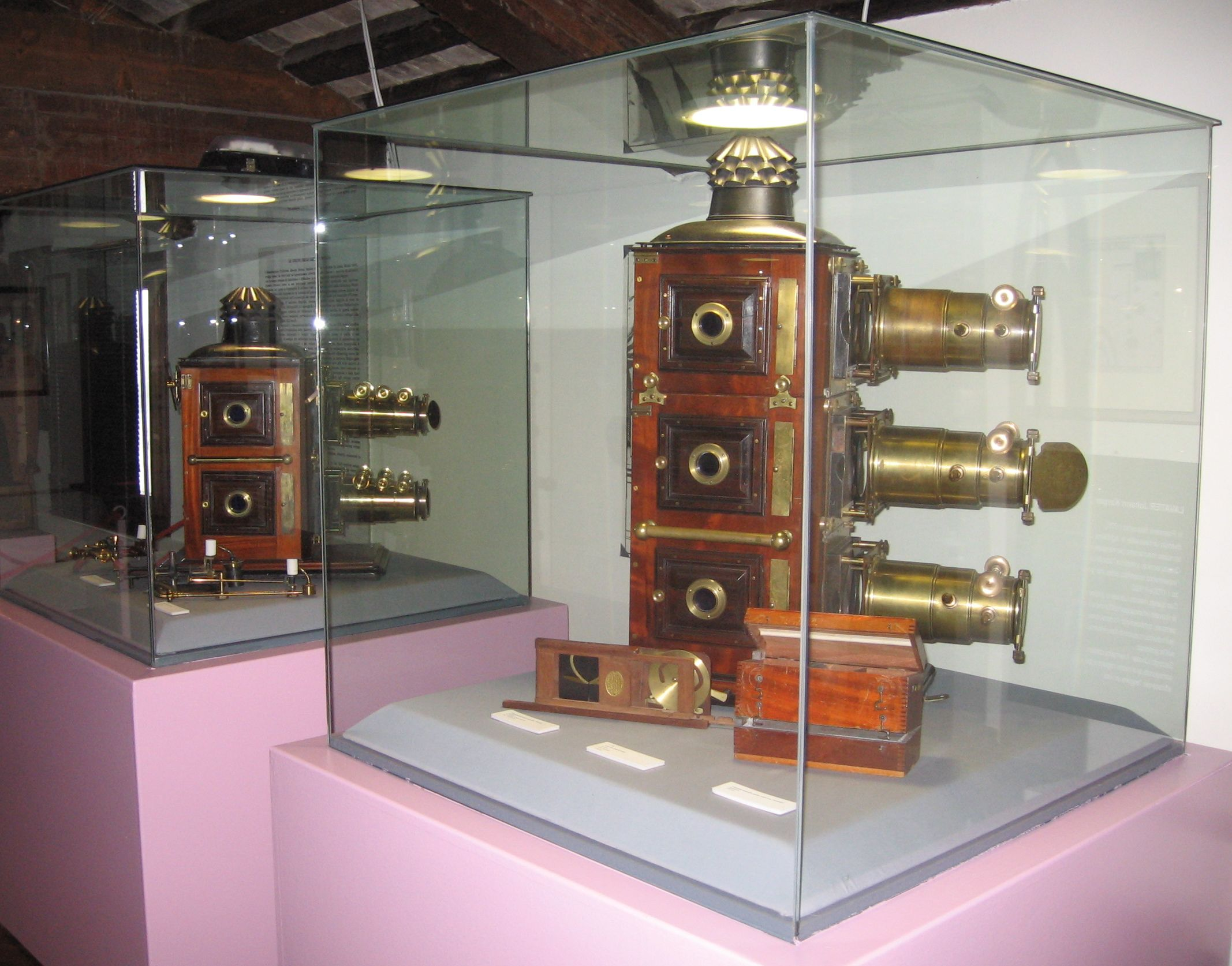
The W.Tyler bi-unial and the J.H.Steward tri-unial mahogany magic lantern (both c. 1880).

The Collezione Minici Zotti is a private collection of objects relating to the history of precinema, such as optical devices and other early visual media that eventually led to the birth of cinema. The collection has been gathered by Laura Minici Zotti, Venetian magic lantern enthusiast and Director of the Museum, who has been collecting since the 1970s. The principal subject is the magic lantern - an antique projection device used to entertain and educate audiences before the invention of the cinematograph. The collection includes original hand-painted glass projection slides and magic lanterns of many different types, such as the phantasmagoria magic lantern, magic lanterns for projection of dissolving views such as the W. Tyler bi-unial lantern and the mahogany tri-unial triple lantern (c. 1880) invented and produced James Henry Steward, an English manufacturer considered to have produced magic lanterns of the finest quality. The collection also includes several single-lens magic lanterns, the P. Harris & Co. Scientific Lantern, the American "Pettibone" lantern, antique paired lanterns and the Walter Gibbons Cinematograph-Lantern.

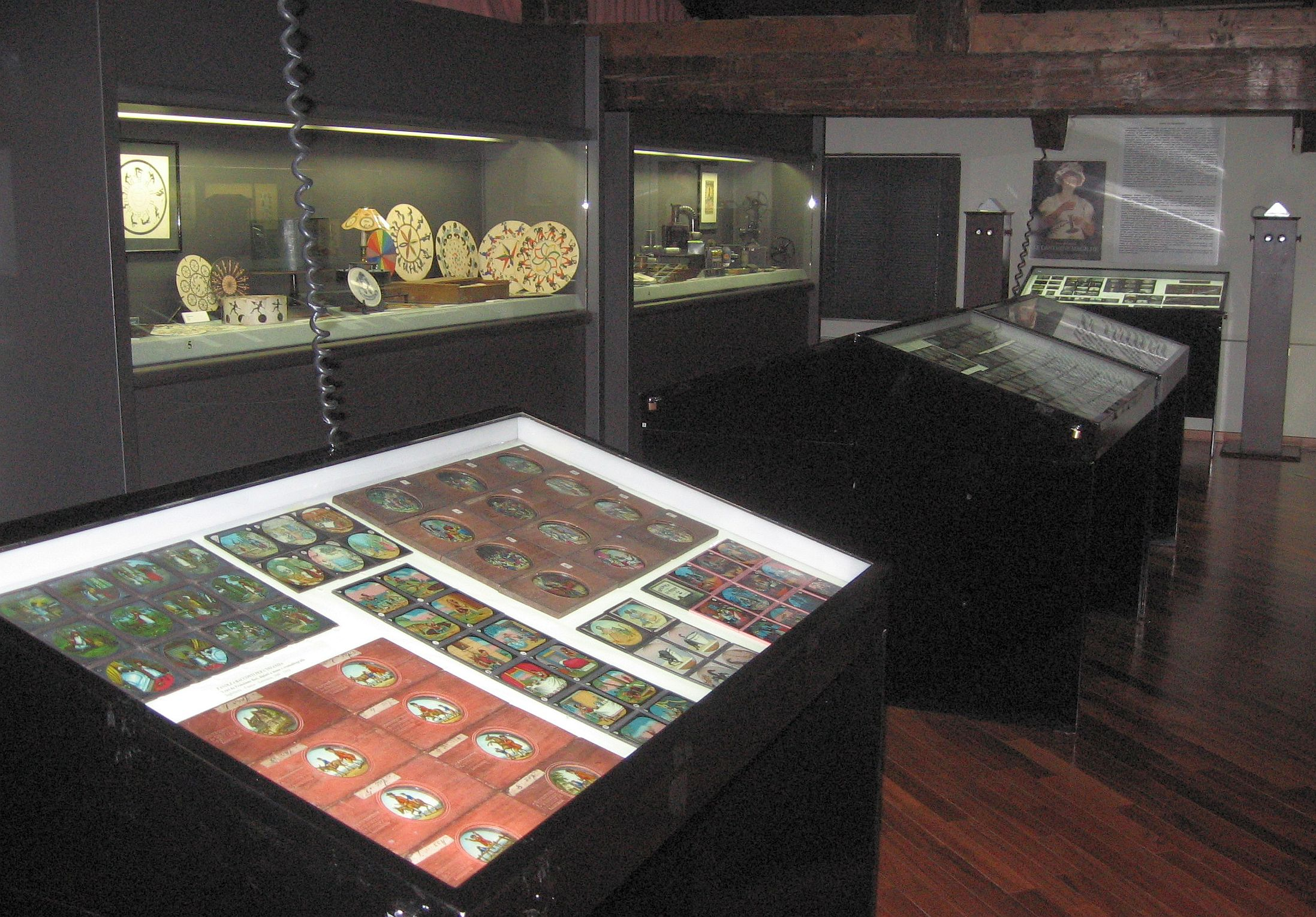
Magic lantern slides and optical toys exhibited inside the Museum of Precinema.

A particularly rare acquisition on the part of the Museum is a magic lantern dating from around 1790 from the Medici Villa at Poggio a Caiano, a temporary residence of the Lorena, Grand Dukes of Tuscany. The magic lantern is complete with its box and 108 original panoramic lantern slides that recount stories from Greek mythology and of Ancient Rome.

Also exhibited are optical images for peepshows (or 'Il Mondo Nuovo') dating from the eighteenth century; a Megalethoscope of 1864 by Carlo Ponti (Photographer), the Stereoscope and early cameras, Anaglyph image, a Camera obscura, and optical toys such as the Zoetrope, Praxinoscope and Phenakistoscope that relate to early animation.

== See also ==
- Precursors of film
- Magic lantern
- Animation
- History of film
- Precinema
