= Jean-Louis de Cordemoy =

French architectural historian (1655–1714)

The Abbé Jean-Louis de Cordemoy (1655–1714) was a French architectural historian, prior of St-Nicolas at La-Ferté-sous-Jouarre (Seine-et-Marne), and a canon at St-Jean-des-Vignes, Soissons (Aisne). His Nouveau Traité de toute l’architecture was amongst the first studies of ecclesiastical architecture, wherein he praised the Gothic style for its clear expression of structure. Influenced by Michel de Frémin and Claude Perrault his ideas of ordonnance, disposition and bienséance as expressions of integrity to nature and structure were early precursors of the modern concepts of functionalism and truth to materials. He had a considerable influence on 18th-century architectural theory, especially Antoine Desgodetz, Marc-Antoine Laugier, de la Hire and Boffrand. He also participated in an acrimonious debate with the engineer Amédée-François Frézier regarding sacred architecture in the Jesuit periodical Mémoires de Trévoux, a skirmish in the Quarrel of the Ancients and the Moderns.

== Life ==
Little is known of the early life of Jean-Louis de Cordemoy, the architectural theorist. He was one of the five sons of Gerauld de Cordemoy (1626-1684), philosopher and historian, member of Jacques-Bénigne Bossuet’s Petit Concile, author of the Discours physique de la parole (Paris, 1668), upheld by Noam Chomsky as a founding text of linguistics. Gerauld de Cordemoy was author also of the Histoire de France, finished off after his death and published in two volumes, 1685 and 1689, by his eldest son, Louis-Gerauld de Cordemoy, abbot of Feniers, a Cistercian foundation, in the Auvergne. Gerauld de Cordemoy’s other children were Joseph-Charles, seigneur of Tournelles at Sery, in the diocese of Soissons, and of l’Epine-aux-Bois (Aisne); Jacques, abbot of Narcé, in the parish of Faye-la-Vineuse, near Richelieu (Indre et Loire); Jeanne-Marguerite, chatelaine of Ailleval, near Roucy, east of Soissons in the Aisne valley; and Adrien, seigneur of La Saulsaye (Sauldaye) and of Nueil, described as “lecteur ordinaire du dauphin”. The Cordemoy family was established in Paris, successively in the rue Brantôme, the rue du Maure, and in a two-story house in the cul-de-sac Beaubourg (later des Anglais), clearly visible on the Turgot map of Paris, now absorbed into the rue Beaubourg. This tiny precinct was inhabited by several architects, among them Libéral Bruant, Pierre Le Maistre and André Perrault.

The Cordemoy sons were, like their father, closely linked to Bossuet’s circle and thus, even after the dramatic rupture of July 1696, with Fénelon. After the revocation of the Edict of Nantes, in 1685, Jacques de Cordemoy formed part of a mission, led by Fénelon, to convert the Protestants of Saintonge. Fénelon arrived in Saintes on 15 December 1685, he returned to Paris in June 1686, but Jacques seems to have stayed on for ten years, or more, based at the port of La Tremblade, on the mouth of the Seudre, south of Rochefort, where Protestants gathered to embark for abroad. His impassioned reports survive from January 1693 to March 1694. Jean-Louis himself, promoted by Jérome Phélypeaux de Pontchartrain, minister de Marine, by his elder brother, Louis-Gerauld, was sent on a mission in 1700 to investigate the feasibility of floating logs by rivers from the Auvergne to the shipbuilding yards at the coast. He drew up a map of the area from Condat (Cantal), hard by Feniers, on the river Santoire, which joined the Rhue, and a parallel route from Valette, to the west, on the Sumène, also joining the Rhue, just before its junction with the Dordogne. A report was submitted in 1705. The project was approved by Vauban, but seems not to have been implemented.

When Jean-Louis took up religious orders is not known. He was, however, appointed prior of Belle Fontaine, a benefice of Saint-Barthelemy at Noyon, in the diocese of Beauvais (Oise), then, in accord with Augustinian practice, prior of Saint-Nicolas at La Ferté-sous-Jouarre, a benefice of Saint-Jean des Vignes at Soissons (Aisne). He was engaged in a lawsuit in 1691 with Paul de Lusignan, bishop of Rodez, abbot of Saint-Barthelemy at Noyon, as to the rights of Belle Fontaine, a case judged in his favour. Bossuet’s brother Antoine, one might note, was intendant de la généralité de Soissons and was a major creditor of Gerauld de Cordemoy when he died. Antoine’s address was given as rue des Fossés-Saint-Jacques, where the Perrault brothers lived, hard against the abbaye de Sainte-Geneviève, in Paris.

== Work ==
Jean-Louis claimed to have done some architectural work, but there is little more to attest to his occupations. According to parish registers, he died on 16 October 1714, at the age of 59, or thereabouts, at La Ferté-sous-Jouarre and was buried next day under the steps of the chancel of Saint-Nicolas. Among the family members present were his brother Joseph-Charles and a nephew, presumably Joseph’s son.

Jean-Louis’ renown was to spring from his Nouveau traité de toute l’architecture, utile aux entrepreneurs, aux ouvriers, et à ceux qui font bâtir, a small book published in Paris in 1706. He was evidently influenced by Claude Perrault’s determination to reduce the complexity of architectural composition and the proportioning of the orders, as evidenced in his translation and commentary on Vitruvius’ ten books on architecture, published in 1673 and, in a revised edition, in 1684, as also by his Ordonnance des cinq espèces de colonnes selon la methode des anciens, of 1683. But Cordemoy was spurred also by the ideas of Michel de Frémin, author of another small book, Mémoires critiques d’architecture. Contenans l’idée de la vraye et la fausse architecture…, published in Paris in 1702. Frémin aimed to reject the authority of the orders entire. He demanded a practical, commonsense approach to architecture. The buildings he upheld as well designed, structurally and acoustically, were the Gothic churches of Notre-Dame and the Sainte Chapelle in Paris.

The radical nature of Cordemoy’s proposals was not to the fore in the first edition of his book. Though he preferred the three Greek orders, more than half his book is taken up with a description of all five orders and their parts, and they are the subject of most of his illustrations. He indicated, in discussing pediments and roof design, that he preferred a four-square silhouette, though it was only when he took up the design of churches that he made clear his preference for an orthogonal architecture – freestanding columns and lintels rather than piers and arches. He roundly condemned the piers and arches of Saint Peter’s in Rome, suggesting that columnar supports, as in the piazza outside, would have been preferable by far. He made the same critique of the Val-de-Grâce in Paris. Following Perrault and Fremin, he also recognized something of the clear-cut structural expression he aimed at in Gothic architecture – he named the churches of Longpoint, Royaumont and Sainte-Croix at Orléans. The terms he used to describe the effect, once again deriving from Perrault, were dégagement (disengagement) and apreté (sharpness). He condemned the bas-relief effect of contemporary architecture. He disliked the numerous motifs and mouldings scattered over the surfaces of buildings. He suggested that even pedestals, applied orders and pilasters might be dispensed with. He preferred plain masonry surfaces He wanted the freestanding column to resume its structural role.

Cordemoy’s proposals were at once attacked by the engineer Amédée-François Frézier, well-versed himself in a knowledge of Gothic construction, but contemptuous of the suggestion that the Gothic arrangement might be reflected by columns and lintels – lintels, given the qualities of French stone, were altogether impractical for long spans, arches were to be preferred. Cordemoy, claiming to have been sequestered for years in the Auvergne, did not reply to Frézier’s letter until 1709. An exchange of letters followed, three more, all published between 1709 and 1712 in the distinguished Jesuit review, Mémoires de Trévoux. Cordemoy’s aims emerged more clearly than before, with the argument, involving much scholarly hairsplitting and sarcasm, centred now on the arrangement of early Christian basilicas as a model for church architecture. The focus, however, remained on the structural role of the column.

Another harbinger for the future were Cordemoy’s remarks on the layout of towns. Alberti had dealt with town planning in his De re aedificatoria, but the subject was not to the fore in French architectural treatises. Cordemoy, unusually, concluded his with twenty or so pages on public spaces in cities. Though Jean-Baptiste Colbert, famously, was concerned with “embellissement” and the ordering of cities, the spur might have been Fénelon’s, in particular his account of the rebuilding of the state of Salenta in that most political of his writings, Les Aventures de Télémaque, of 1699. Fénelon, again and again, in his writings, promoted architecture of the practical and simple kind, and on two occasions, even, as a proof of the existence of god. Fénelon, however, was repelled by Gothic architecture, which he regarded as evidence of the decline of the church. Bossuet too, seems to have shared such sentiments. He referred to bad writing as “barbare, comme une église gothique” (barbaric, like a Gothic church).

Cordemoy’s treatise was issued again in 1714, together with two of his letters in reply to Frézier, another letter in his defence by one of his brothers, recently deceased, which indicates Jacques or, the youngest, Adrien, sieur de La Saulsaye (Louis-Gerauld is variously reported to have died in 1718 and 1722), together with a dictionary of architectural terms. This was the edition most often referred to.

No more than a handful of churches were to be built in France during the first half of the eighteenth century with freestanding columns and lintels, but the subject of the letters was taken up (unacknowledged) by Antoine Desgodetz, professor at the Académie d’Architecture from 1719 until his death in 1728. Like Cordemoy, he discussed the orders at length, but over the years he expanded his lectures to include a range of building types. His lectures on church design seem to have been introduced in 1723. He dealt in detail with early Christian basilicas. The models of the churches that he proposed were all based on them, with freestanding columns along their naves, but carrying arches, not lintels. The radical nature of Cordemoy’s proposals became evident only in 1753, when they were taken up (duly acknowledged) by Marc-Antoine Laugier in yet another small book, the Essai sur l’architecture, and infused in the conceit of the primitive hut – four tree trunks supporting four horizontal beams, with a pitched roof over – providing an image (illustrated only in the edition of 1755) of all the essential elements of architecture and thus the reference for all architectural judgment. Any other features were to be regarded as superfluous and thus redundant. This was the model for a rational architecture. And it was taken up, albeit elaborated, in 1757, as the model for the most ambitious church of the century, Jacques-Germain Soufflot’s Sainte-Geneviève (now known as the Panthéon) in Paris. Perrault, Cordemoy, Laugier and Soufflot all considered that the arrangement they upheld was a proper expression of that of both the Greek temple and the Gothic church. This notion of structural expression was to condition much of the theory and the architecture of the following centuries.

Laugier was also to stir a new interest in town planning, expanding Cordemoy’s remarks to provide a whole chapter in his Essai, “De l’embellissement des villes”.

Cordemoy and Laugier are sometimes given the title of Abbé, not strictly correctly; the term was applied loosely to ecclesiastics in the eighteenth century.
