= Jonathan Dewald =

American historian

Jonathan Stewart Dewald (born in New York state) is an American historian focusing on the social and cultural history of early modern Europe, as well as the intellectual history and political history of France. He is currently the SUNY Distinguished Professor and Director of Graduate Studies at the State University of New York at Buffalo.

Dewald was educated in Berkeley, California, where he was awarded a BA by Swarthmore College in 1968, an MA by the University of California, Berkeley in 1969, and a PhD by UC-Berkeley in 1974. He then taught history for 16 years at the University of California, Irvine, becoming a Full Professor.

Dewald was granted a Guggenheim Fellowship for 1986–87. He then returned to Buffalo in 1990 as a SUNY Professor. He became a UB Distinguished Professor from 2002–2017, and subsequently a SUNY Distinguished Professor. Dewald currently teaches a broad range of classes at the University at Buffalo for both undergraduate and graduate students.

Dewald's primary teaching interests cover European intellectual history from Aquinas to Freud, world civilisations, history of warfare, early modern History of Europe, history of France, and political history.

Publications: The Formation of a Provincial Nobility: The Magistrates of the Parlement of Rouen, 1499-1610 (Princeton, Princeton University Press, 1980)

Pont-St-Pierre, 1398-1789: Lordship, Community, and Capitalism in Early Modern France (Berkeley, University of California Press, 1987)

Aristocratic Experience and the Origins of Modern Culture: France, 1570-1715 (Berkeley, University of California Press, 1993)

The European Nobility, 1400-1800 (Cambridge, Cambridge University Press, 1996)

(editor-in-chief), Europe 1450-1789: Encyclopedia of the Early Modern World, 6 vols. (New York, Charles Scribner's Sons, 2004)

Lost Worlds: The Emergence of French Social History, 1815-1970 (University Park, Penn State University Press, 2006)

Status, Power, and Identity in Early Modern France: The Rohan Family, 1550-1715 (University Park, Penn State University Press, 2015)

Awards: National Endowment for the Humanities, Fellowship, 1981-1982 John Simon Guggenheim Memorial Fellowship, 1986-1987 Leo Gershoy Award, American Historical Association, for "the most outstanding work in English on any aspect of the field of seventeenth-and eighteenth-century European history," 1994 Institute for Advanced Study, Princeton, Fellowship, 1994-1995 German Academic Exchange Service (DAAD), Study Grant, January–February, 1998 Visiting Scholar, Max-Planck-Institut fuer Geschichte, Goettingen, January–February, 1998 Bainton Prize for Reference, Sixteenth Century Studies Conference, 2004 Guest Fellowship, Freiburg Institute for Advanced Studies, May–June, 2011
