= Carlo Lodoli =

Italian priest and architectural theorist (1690–1761)

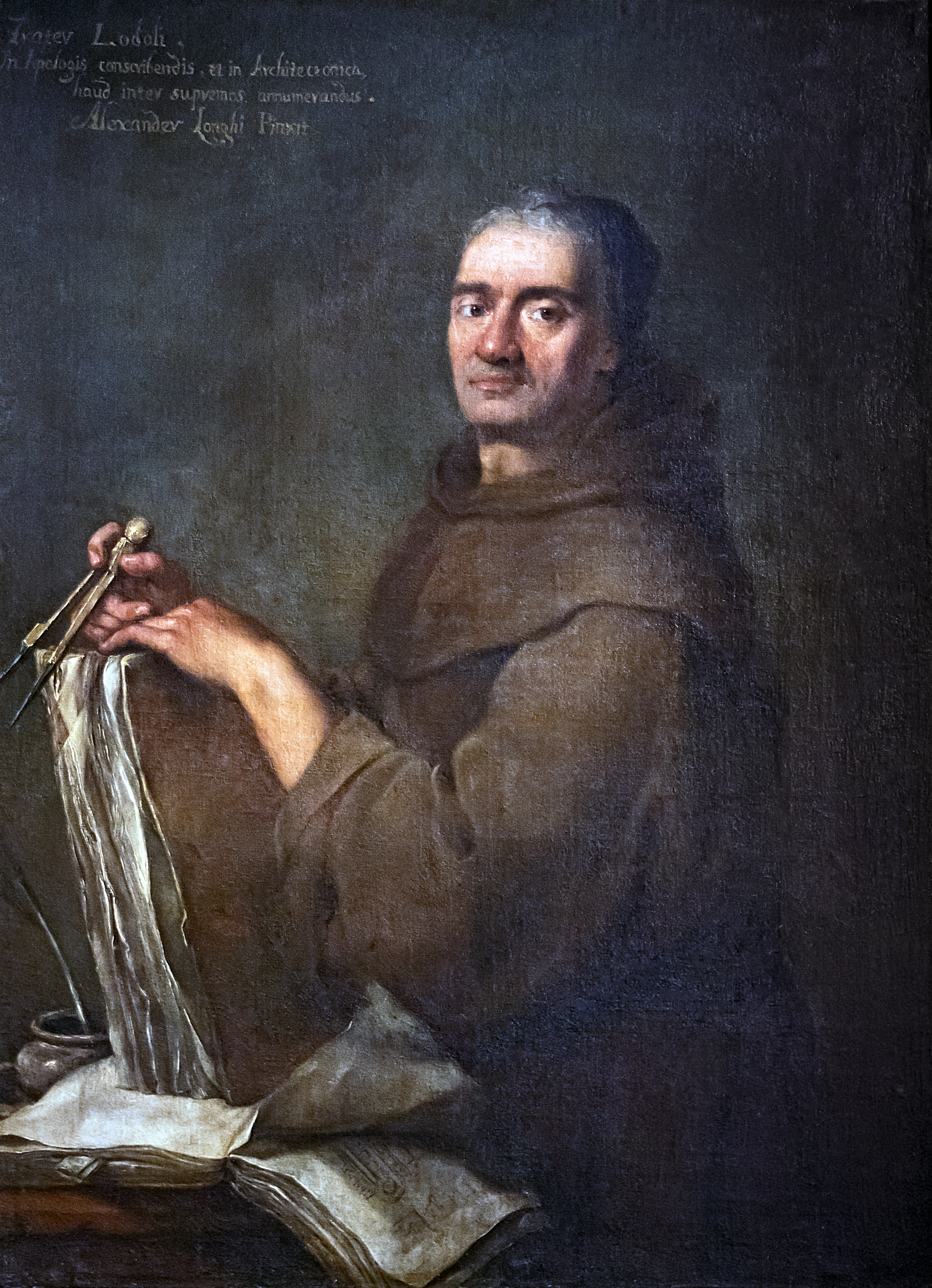
- Portrait of Carlo Lodoli by Alessandro Longhi, 1760s
- Born: November 28, 1690; Venice, Republic of Venice
- Died: 27 October 1761 (aged 70); Padua, Republic of Venice
- Resting place: Convento di San Francesco Grande (Padua)
- Occupations: Architectural theorist, architect, Franciscan priest, mathematician, teacher
- Notable work: Apologhi immaginati (1787)
- Movement: Rationalism

Notes
- He is known as the Socrates of architecture

Carlo Lodoli (28 November 1690 – October 27, 1761) was a Venetian architectural theorist, Franciscan priest, mathematician and teacher, whose work anticipated modernist notions of functionalism and truth to materials. He claimed that architectural forms and proportions should be derived from the abilities of the material being used. He is sometimes referred to as the Socrates of architecture. Since his own writings have been lost his theories are only known from the works of others. Together with architects and architectural theorists including Claude Perrault, Abbé Jean-Louis de Cordemoy, Abbé Marc-Antoine Laugier, Lodoli articulated a rational architecture which challenged the prevailing Baroque and Rococo styles.

== Biography ==
Carlo Lodoli came from a family who had close connections with the Venetian Arsenal and military engineering. After completing his initial studies at the monastery of San Francesco della Vigna, Venice, in 1706 he became an Observant Friar Minor in Dalmatia.

In 1709 he was transferred to the monastery of Santa Maria in Ara Coeli in Rome, where he continued his studies in philosophy, science, theology, Greek and French. He remained in Rome for about four years, during which time he developed his interest in art and architecture; he was then transferred to the monastery of San Biagio in Forlì.

From 1715 to 1720 he lived in Verona, where he began teaching astronomy, physics and mathematics to Veronese noblemen, and philosophy to the novices of the monastery of San Bernardino. Also in Verona he contributed to an edition of the works of the French humanist Marcus Antonius Muretus and began his friendship with the writer Angelo Calogerà and Francesco Scipione Maffei. During this period he probably also visited Tuscany, including Florence, acquiring a profound knowledge of the art of the region.

In 1720 Lodoli was transferred to Venice to teach theology and was immediately at the centre of the city’s cultural life. Also during the 1720s Lodoli was engaged in the extension and reorganization of the library of San Francesco della Vigna and acted as historian of the Franciscan Order and its writers. In the 1730s Lodoli began to teach the sons of Venetian noblemen. Architecture was included in the course of study, and in the garden of San Francesco della Vigna he assembled a collection of architectural fragments for teaching purposes.

From 1739 to 1751 Lodoli held the office of Padre Generale Commissario di Terra Santa in Venice, and he also devoted himself to the restoration (1739–43) of the pilgrim’s hospice attached to the monastery. This project, the only one Lodoli executed, encapsulates the essence of his architectural theories as set out in the only surviving original source: two draft outlines of his unpublished treatise on architecture (untraced), which appeared in the second volume of Andrea Memmo’s Elementi d’architettura lodoliana. In these two draft outlines, Lodoli’s functionalism and rationalism are expressed in condensed form. According to Memmo, Lodoli wanted to find in architecture the same scientific principles that Galileo Galilei had discovered in physics; his architecture thus assumed the character of a science based on certain principles and static rules. It also concerned the search for structural truth, expressed in terms of a building’s solidity, which involved the honest use of materials, especially stone. This concept reflected the military engineering environment of the Venetian Arsenal and the rationalist and anti-Baroque tendencies present in Venice in the early 18th century.

Lodoli argued that proper function and form were the only final, scientific aims of civil architecture, and that nothing should be put on show that is not a working part of the structure. The different architectural systems of antiquity were set out, but Vitruvius’ five orders of architecture were criticized as being inappropriate to stone because they were originally based on timber structures. Following an original classification, the treatise deals with the primary integral elements of architecture, solidity and proportion, as well as with the secondary integral elements, convenience and ornament. Lodoli admitted ornament, except mosaic, and in order to overcome the monotony of continuous imitation of the same forms he encouraged the invention of new ones or the selection from ancient and modern architectural styles, including Gothic and Moorish, of ornament that suited the characteristics of stone. According to Memmo, Lodoli also admitted those elements of the Classical orders that corresponded to a structure’s function and suited the characteristics of stone: columns, bases, capitals, pedestals, triglyphs, metopes and consoles. He particularly favoured ground-floor rustication and included drawings of 16 different types in his treatise. His taste for Doric and Tuscan capitals probably arose from the fact that to him, as later to his friend Piranesi, these represented examples of primitive Italic architecture, the origin of the art.

Passionately keen on painting and sculpture, he was one of the first connoisseurs of medieval art, and his own collection, which included relics of Hellenistic and Byzantine painting as well as primitive and modern works, was arranged in such a way as to illustrate the development of art.

== Works and legacy ==
Lodoli was hugely influential in the development of modern architecture. According to Rudolf Wittkower "his personal influence seems to have been more vital than that of any other theorist of architecture of the eighteenth century."

The critical reception of Lodoli’s ideas has had a rather complex history, partly because, with the loss of his original writings, they are known only indirectly through the works of others. Girolamo Zanetti reported that in 1754, after 20 years, Lodoli finally completed his treatise on architecture, but that he refused to publish it. After an unsuccessful attempt by Federico Foscari, Francesco Algarotti endeavoured to publicise Lodoli's thinking in his own work Saggio sopra l'architettura (1757) albeit in a somewhat watered down form, emphasising imitation rather than Lodoli's daring anti-Baroque rationalism. It was Andrea Memmo who attempted to do justice to Lodoli's theories in his work Elementi d'architettura lodoliana (1786) published one year before the first edition of the only book bearing Lodoli's name, Apologhi immaginati (1787); a collection remarks and tales, often paradoxical in nature, told to his friends and pupils. Another pupil of Lodoli's, Francesco Milizia (1725–1798) published a long treatise, Principles of Civic Architecture (1781), which presented an exhaustive architectural system inspired by contemporary science.

== Bibliography ==
- Golzio, Vincenzo (1934). "LODOLI, Carlo". Enciclopedia Italiana. Rome: Istituto dell'Enciclopedia Italiana.
- Gengaro, Maria Luisa (1937). "Il valore dell'architettura nella teoria settecentesca del padre Carlo Lodoli". L'Arte. 40: 313–17.
- Kaufmann, Emil (1944). "At an Eighteenth Century Crossroads: Algarotti vs. Lodoli". Journal of the Society of Architectural Historians. 4 (2): 23–29. doi:10.2307/901186. JSTOR 901186.
- Gabrielli, Anna Maria (1945). "La teoria architettonica di Carlo Lodoli". Arti figurative: Rivista d'arte antica e moderna. 3: 123–36.
- De Benedetti, Mara (1957). "La teoria dell'architettura funzionale del Lodoli e la pratica dell'architettura in Italia". Atti del V Convegno Nazionale di Storia dell'architettura. Florence: 157–63.
- Kaufmann jr, Emil (1964). "Memmo's Lodoli". Art Bulletin. 46 (2): 159–75. doi:10.1080/00043079.1964.10790157.
- Rykwert, Joseph (1983). The First Moderns: The Architects of the Eighteenth Century. Cambridge, MA: MIT Press. pp. 288–337.
- Consoli, Gian Paolo (2006). "Architecture and History: Vico, Lodoli, Piranesi". Memoirs of the American Academy in Rome. Supplementary Volumes. 4: 195–210. JSTOR 4238473.
- Cellauro, Louis (2006). "Carlo Lodoli and architecture. Career and theory of an eighteenth-century pioneer of modernism". Architectura. 36 (1): 25–59.
- Ungureanu, Cosmin (2011). ""Sia funzion la rappresentazione", Carlo Lodoli and the Crisis of Architecture". Journal of the International Association of Research in the History of Art. 18.
- Cellauro, Louis (2019). "In quest of comfort: Carlo Lodoli, theorist of organic architecture and furniture designer". Papers of the British School at Rome. 87: 267–307. doi:10.1017/S0068246218000405. ISSN 0068-2462.
