= Cesare Mariani =

Italian painter (1826–1901)

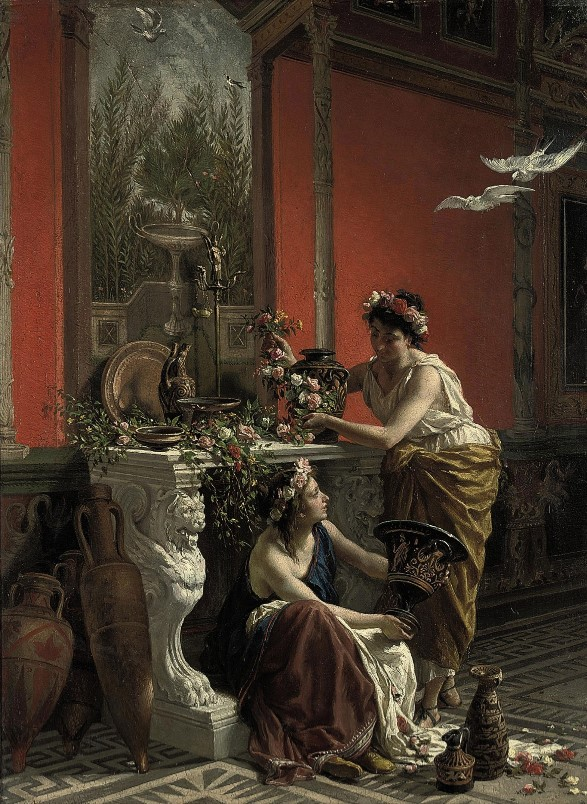
The flower maidens

Cesare Mariani (January 13, 1826 – February 21, 1901) was an Italian painter and architect of the late-19th century, active in Rome and Ascoli Piceno.

== Early life and training ==
He was born in Rome to Pietro and Maria Agnelletti; his father worked for the Giustiniani family. This helped him access in 1837 to studies at the Accademia San Luca of Rome. His first masters were a painter by the name of Delicati and G. Silvagni, who taught design at the academy. He entered the studio of Tommaso Minardi from 1842 to 1850. There he worked alongside Guglielmo De Sanctis, Cesare Fracassini, Nicola Consoni, and Cesare Marianecci. One of his works were displayed at the Universal Exposition in London of 1851. His work was influenced by works of Ingres and the Nazarene movement, but also by Francesco Hayez's interest in genre depiction, and which differed from the more academic style of Vincenzo Cammuccini. Mariani painted a portrait for the Monument to Cardinal R. Fornari (1855, Santa Maria sopra Minerva, Rome).

== Mature work ==
His easel paintings gave him a good degree of success. He moved into a room in the Palazzo Dovizielli on Via Margutta. Sharing the flat were painter Bernardo Celentano and Fracassini. Here he painted Sappho (1858), followed by The Diviner, Astrologer in the act of Divination, and a Music Lesson exhibited in the 1861 Universal Exhibition in Florence. Mainardi gained commissions in frescoes for many churches and palaces in Rome, Lazio, Umbria and finally in the Marche and Abruzzo. For example, he helped complete the decoration (1857–1860) for the rebuilt basilica of San Paolo fuori le Mura, working on Paul laying on of hands on Barnabas in Antioch and The Magician Elymas in Pafo del Sud.

His also worked on the decoration of the church of Santa Maria in Monticelli, restored by the architect Francesco Azzurri. Mariani entirely frescoed the vault with Christian heroines, the presbytery with Christ and Christ teaches children between the crowds in the hall of the temple, the wall above the organ with Moses and the burning bush, Jacob's Dream, the choir with Saint Cecilia in the midst of a choir of angels, painted in monochrome on a design by Minardi. In 1862 he moved to Arpino to decorate the ceiling of the Palazzo Sangermano, with a fresco depicting Chariot of Venus with some nymphs, for which he was paid 200 scudi.

In 1863, he married Virginia Barlocci, herself a painter and ceramist, widow of the painter Bernardino Riccardi, and by September of the same year he was appointed academic of merit in the Accademia di San Luca.

In 1865, he completed frescoes for the church of Santa Maria in Aquiro, during its restoration by G. Morichini between 1861 and 1866. Here he painted three octagons with angels in the ceiling, with evangelists and angels on the pendents. He also painted the four Doctors of the Church on pillars of the nave and the Eternal Father on a gold background in the dome.

In 1868, he became a member of the Artistic Commission for Roman Copperplate Engraving. After the death of Cesare Fracassini, Mariani, along with Francesco Grandi, and Coghetti, were asked to complete the fresco decoration of the newly rebuilt Basilica of San Lorenzo fuori le Mura. He painted a Martyrdom and Burial of St Stephen, both destroyed during the bombing of 1943 (the Martyrdom was reproduced in 1920 by G. Fantoni of Gemona on the vault of the parish of San Stefano in San Stino of Livenza). He helped decorate the Sanctuary of Santa Maria Auxilium Christianorum Trevi, near Montefalco in Umbria. On the vault, he painted Apostles, Prophets, Patriarchs and Sibyls, in the pendentives, Heroines of the Bible and a Coronation of the Virgin in the apse. The altarpieces of the sanctuary were painted by Pollastrini and Overbeck.

In 1870, he worked with Domenico Bruschi in frescos for the Palazzo della Consulta in Rome. He completed the figures of Geometry and Dialectic for the monument of the Roman Cemetery of Verano. He completed an altarpiece of the Presentation of Jesus at the Temple for a cycle of paintings about the mysteries of the Rosary for the Cathedral in Santiago, Chile. He frescoed the walls and painted the altarpiece (1870) for the Chapel of St Matthew in the church of Santo Stefano del Cacco. He also frescoed (1870–74) the cupola, lunettes of the counterfacade, and the chapel of the Crucifix of the church of Santa Maria di Loreto alla Colonna Traiana.

He decorated in the oratory of the Merchants at the Convent of the Gesù, and painted a St Bridget between the windows of the nave of Santa Maria in Trastevere (1872). He painted frescoes for the Chapel of the Madonna in San Salvatore in Onda (1875–76), and the ceiling of Sant' Omobono (1877), the nave and chancel in San Giuseppe dei Falegnami near the Mamertine Jail, restored by A. Parisi (1880–83), and finally he painted two panels in San Rocco Ripetta (1885).

In 1887 he painted a Japanese Martyrs crucified in 1597 in Nagasaki for the church of San Antonio di Padua on Via Merulana. He also painted two versions of this painting for the School of Giovanni Battista de la Salle (1887–88) and contributed to the cycles of frescoes for the Cathedral of St. Emidio at Ascoli Piceno (1884–91) and for the shrine of Santa Maria delle Grazie in Teramo. In Teramo, he also painted a triptych depicting the Virgin Enthroned with Saints Francis and Anne for the Savini chapel, and decorated the palace city of the same family.

In 1878, he won a contest to paint the main Hall of the Finance Ministry, where he depicted an allegory of the Unity of Italy with Illustrious Men of Past and Present. He lost a competition to Maccari to paint the So-called Yellow Hall of the Senate; Maccari went on to paint his masterpiece Cicero Denounces Catiline.

He painted frescoes for a number of Roman palaces including the Marignoli and Bobrinski. Mariani gave drawing lessons to the Prince of Naples Vittorio Emanuele and was commissioned to paint a frieze in the Royal apartments of the Palazzo Quirinale. He also painted a canvas about the Kingship being offered to Emanuele Filiberto, which was sent to the International Exhibition of Rome in 1883. He completed paintings for the chapel of San Giovanni Miani. For Santa Lucia del Gonfalone, he painted frescoes with three scenes: The Vision of St Bonaventure, Pope Sixtus V blesses the Redeemed Barbary Slaves, and The oath of Giovanni Cerrone. In 1867, he was commissioned by Signore Baldini Giustiniani to paint frescoes at the Castello at Rocca di Lanciano, depicting Aurora and the Chariot of the Sun.

He continued the inveterate tradition of Italian religious frescoes with work at the Cathedral of Ascoli Piceno, the church of Madonna delle Grazie in the city of Teramo in the region of Abruzzo and the churches of Santa Maria del Suffragio and Santo Stefano del Cacco. Cesare's style owes as much to the Italian heritage as to modern Pre-Raphaelite Brotherhood styles; in effect, his work at Sant' Emidio, named for a 4th-century saint, is striking for its faith that art could revitalize a hagiography that was waning in a secularizing Italy.

== Awards and teaching roles ==
In May 1870, he was appointed as Knight of the Order of St. Gregory the Great by Pope Pius IX. After just over a year, July 30, 1871, he was appointed Knight of the Order of the Crown of Italy, and in 1872 the Emperor Pedro II of Brazil awarded him the Cross of the Order of the Rose. In 1870, he became a member of Academies of Fine Arts of many cities in Italy, including Perugia, Florence, Milan, Urbino, Carrara, Orvieto, and Ravenna. He was also named to the council than of Fine Arts of the Ministry of Public Education. In 1872, the city council of Rome sent Mariani to National Art Exhibition in Milan, and in 1873, he was on the jury of the World Exhibition in Vienna with Filippo Palizzi.

From 1888 to 1890 he was president of the Accademia di San Luca. The last official task of the artist was to participate in 1896 in the juried competition, "Per una memoria sulla tecnica dei dipinti", launched by the Ministry of Education public, replacing Francesco Jacovacci. He was reduced to inactivity in 1898, the same year of the death of his wife, and died in Rome on February 21, 1901.
