= Giuseppe Marri =

Italian engraver

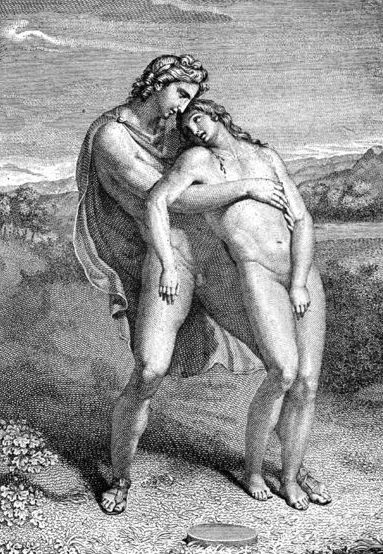
Apollo and Hyacinth

Giuseppe Marri (11 June 1788–7 August 1852) was an Italian engraver.

He initially attended the Faentine School of Design under Zauli, and alongside Tommaso Minardi and Michele Sangiorgi. He was then sponsored by the Faentine Congregation of Charity, to travel to Rome to apprentice as an engraver. In 1818 he moved to Milan to work under the engraver Giuseppe Longhi. In 1830, he returned to his native Faenza, to direct the School of Design, now directed by Saviotti, and renamed the School of Drawing and Engraving. In 1849 he accepted a similar position in the city of Forlì.
