= Antonio Berti (painter) =

Italian painter (1830–1912)

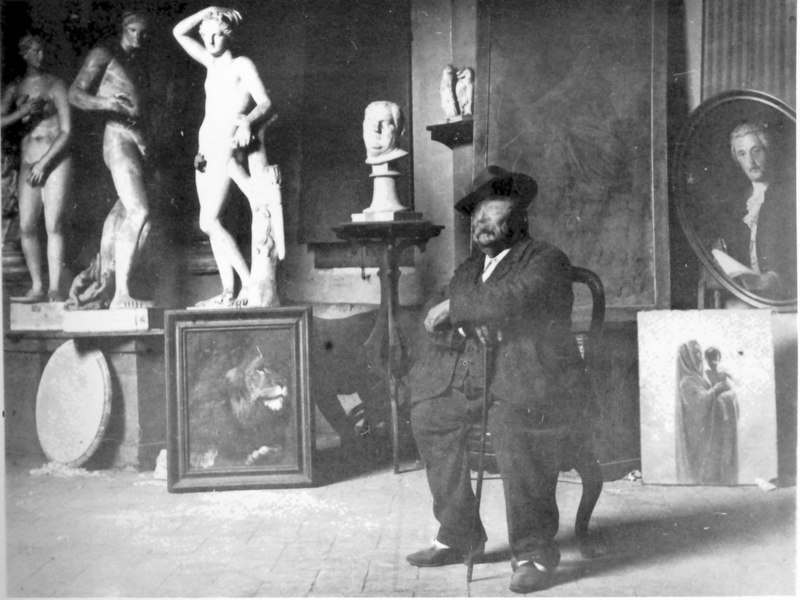
- Antonio Berti in 1906
- Born: 20 September 1830; Faenza, Italy
- Died: 14 July 1912 (aged 81); Faenza, Italy
- Education: Academy of Fine Arts, Florence (1852-1857)
- Known for: painter
- Movement: Orientalist, Romanticism

Antonio Berti (Faenza, 20 September 1830 – Faenza, 14 July 1912) was an Italian painter, mainly portraits, landscapes, and romantic scenes.

== Life and career ==
The son of Giacinto Berti, Antonio was born in Faenza on 20 September. 1830. As a boy and a young man, he studied in the local school of design and painting with the engraver Giuseppe Marri (1788–1852), architect Pietro Tomba (1774–1846), and painter Achille Farina. With the help of local patrons, in 1852 he traveled to Florence for five years to study at the Academy of Fine Arts under Ciseri, Pollastrini, and Ussi. He was a minor collaborator in the completion of the Ussi's large canvas of The Expulsion of the Duke of Athens.

He returned to Faenza, and in 1864 became a teacher at the Scuola Comunale di Disegno, which he transformed into a School of Arts and Crafts. In 1906, he was named director. He also wrote a number of essays on painting on ceramics. He died in Faenza in 1912.

== Work ==
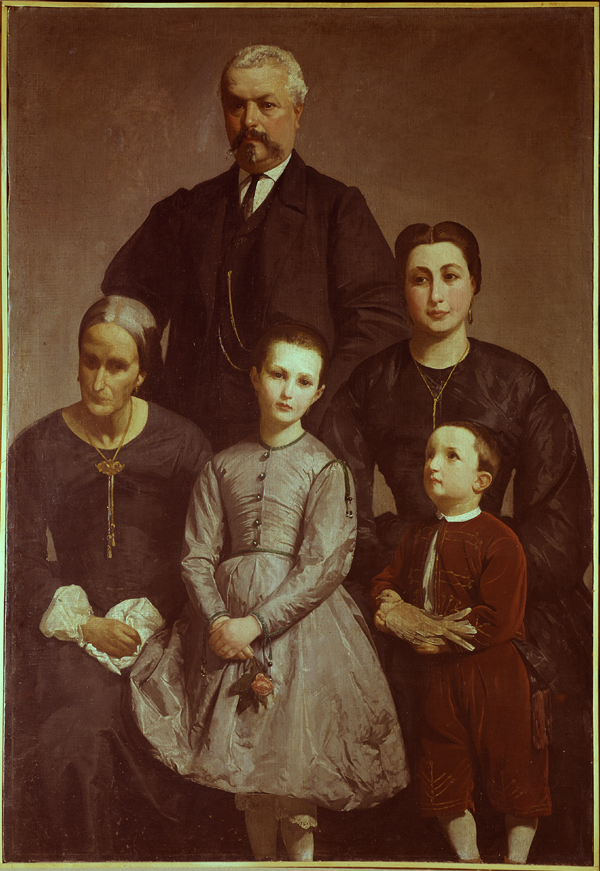
La Famiglia Castellani, 1867-69

From his time in Florence, some of his work was inspired by Orientalist subjects, and inspired by Ussi. He also was influenced by Giovanni Fattori, his friend Odoardo Borrani, and Luigi Bechi. Among his masterworks are: La Famiglia Castellani (1867–69; Pinacoteca di Faenza) and the Lady with Umbrella. He also painted ceramics. Among his pupils was Tommaso Dal Pozzo.

Critics tended to ignore Berti's work. However, a reappraisal in 1955, to mark the exhibition of nineteenth-century artists from Romagna, finally noticed his work, praising him in a flattering manner. Biography of Antonio Berti at Dizionario-Biografico

Select list of paintings

- Landscape with Turkey Herd, 1880
- Angelo, [Angel], date unknown
- Passeaggio Fluviale, 1908

== See also ==
- List of Orientalist artists
- Orientalism
