= Fracassi =

Fracassi is an Italian surname. Notable people with this surname include:

- Cesare Fracassi (1838–1868), Italian painter
- Clemente Fracassi (1917–1993), Italian film producer, director and screenwriter
- Fabrizio Fracassi (born 1957), Italian politician

== See also ==
- Fracassini
