= Alessandro Capalti =

Italian painter (1807–1868)

Alessandro Capalti (25 September 1807 – 18 March 1868) was an Italian painter, mainly of historical subjects and portraits.

== Biography ==
He was born in Rome, and there became a pupil of Tommaso Minardi and Gaspare Landi at the Academy of St Luke. He lived in Rome most of his life. In 1840, he was named professor of merit at the Academy. He went on to fill Minardi's position as professor of design in 1854. He was awarded with the honor of the Order of San Silvestro by Pope Gregory XVI and of the Order of San Gregorio Magno by Pius IX. He exhibited at the Royal Academy in London between 1851 and 1858. He painted portraits of Gwendoline Talbot, Princess Borghese, his former master Minardi, and the actress Adelaide Ristori. A Raphaelesque St Catherine is part of the Royal Collection Trust, and is located at Osborne House. His painting depicting the Circumcision of Jesus was the main altarpiece of the Church of the Gesù, Rome.

One of his pupils was Francesco Jacovacci.
