= Paolo Costa (poet) =

Italian poet, writer and philosopher

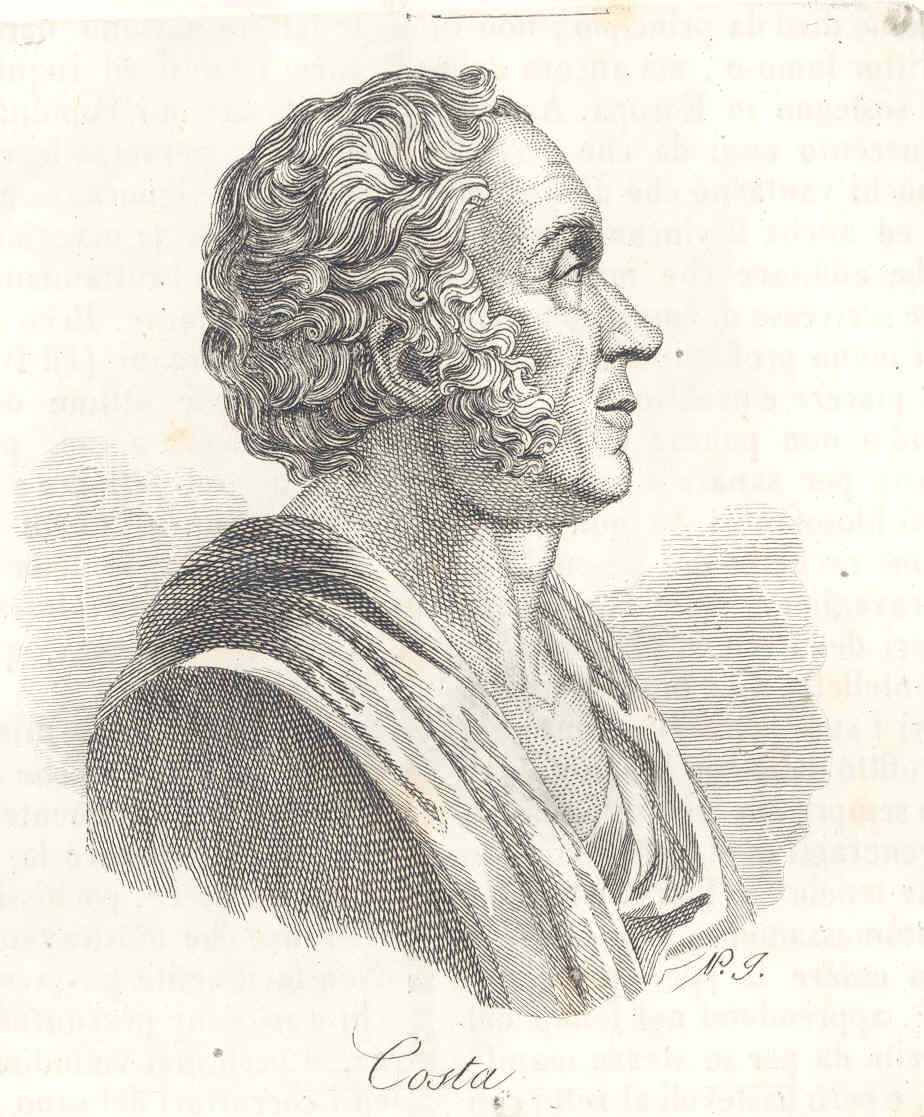
Portrait of Costa

Paolo Costa (13 June 1771, Ravenna – 20 December 1836, Bologna) was an Italian poet, writer and philosopher. The son of Domenico Costa and Lucrezia Ricciarelli, he began his studies in 1780 in Ravenna under modest teachers. He then moved to Padua and studied there under Melchiorre Cesarotti and Simone Stratico. His studies were interrupted by the French invasion and occupation in 1797, during which he held government roles in both Ravenna and Bologna.

He resumed his studies under Giordano Bianchi Dottula, Dionigi Strocchi and Pietro Giordani and became chair in philosophy at the lyceum in Treviso during the Kingdom of Italy. However, the lyceum was suppressed on the Restoration and from 1822 to 1831 he was a private tutor in a villa in Bologna. He was suspected of being implicated with the Carboneria and so in 1831 he was forced to flee to Corfu. He returned to Bologna in 1832, where he died four years later.

== Works ==
- Paolo Costa, Vita di Dante – Della Elocuzione, Fara editore, S. Arcangelo di Romagna
- Paolo Costa, Della sintesi e dell'analisi, Fara editore, S. Arcangelo di Romagna, 1824
