= Gaspare Mattioli =

Italian painter (1806–1843)

Gaspare Mattioli (1806–1843) was an Italian painter who worked in a Neoclassical style.

He was born in Faenza, and initially studied ornamentation and figure painting respectively under Giuseppe Zauli and Pasquale Saviotti at the Academy in Faenza. He then traveled in 1824 to study in Bologna, and subsequently spent three years working under Pietro Benvenuti at the Academy of Fine Arts in Florence. After a spell in Venice, in the 1830s, he move to Rome to work in the studio of Tommaso Minardi in Rome, and returned in 1836 to his native city. He painted portraits, for which he is best known, but also religious, historic, figure, and decorative paintings. He also briefly studied lithography with Angiolini firm in Bologna.

His painting of the Murder of Galeotto Manfredi, displayed in the Pinacoteca of Faenza, depicts the murder of this Lord of Ravenna, by four assassins, in a plot conjured by his wife Francesca, the daughter of Giovanni II Bentivoglio, Lord of Bologna.

The main altar of the church of San Pietro in Fognano, in the Province of Ravenna, has a Christ handing keys to St Peter (1843). The background depicts the shores of the Lamone river near Fognano.
