= Teatro Masini, Faenza =

Opera house in Faenza, Italy

Coordinates: 44.28561°N 11.88208°E

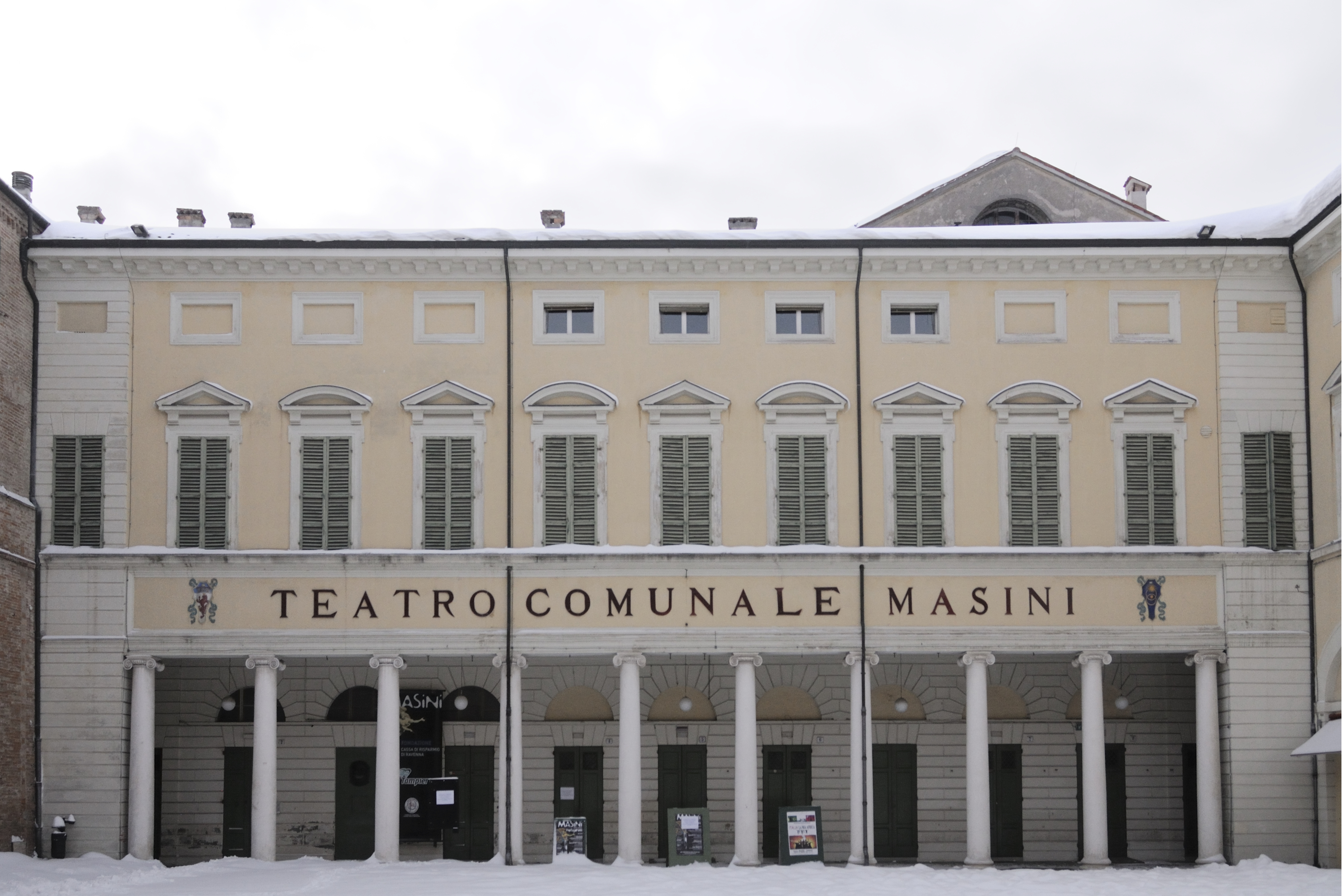

The Teatro Angelo Masini is an opera house located on Piazza Nenni in central Faenza, region of Emilia-Romagna, Italy.

The structure was built during 1780–1787 to replace the antecedent and smaller Teatro dell'Accademia dei Remoti which had been located in the Palazzo del Podestà. The Academy of the Remote had been originally been founded in 1673 as a literary and erudite society. Meeting in the Palazzo del Podesta, in 1714 they decided to erect a small crowded theater in their meeting hall with three orders, designed by Carlo Cesare Scaletta and inaugurated on 21 June 1723. But the seating began to fall into ruin, and alternate plans were commissioned. The architect Giuseppe Pistocchi had suggested to build a new theater in the Podesta, but the location was moved to this courtyard-piazza for this theater. Much of the funding was provided by the municipality. The inaugural performances included two ballets and the opera Caio Ostilio by Francesco Bianchi.

In 1826, it underwent its first refurbishment under Filippo Antolini and Antonio Argnani. The refurbishment cleaned some of the soot created by the lamps, and modified the central balcony seats which had double height. Pasquale Saviotti in 1827 painted a new theater curtain (sipario). In 1850-1853 and 1869, other refurbishments were pursued. More recent refurbishment in the 1990s updated numerous safety features.

In 1903, the name of the theater was changed in honor of the famous opera tenor Angelo Masini (1844-1926). The interior of the theater has a series of bas-reliefs in terracotta depicting events from classic mythology and Ancient Roman history. At the highest register are a series of statues also by Gaetano Trentanove depicting individuals from the classic myths.

A long gallery, still called the Galleria or the Ridotto dei Cento Pacific, was built along the facade. The Cento or hundred refers to an oligarchy of magnates and magistrates which pacified the town during the conflicts between the Guelphs and Ghibellines. This oligarchic congregation was abolished in 1797 by the Napoleonic government, who feared its opposition. The gallery links the theater and a wing of Palazzo Manfredi which runs along Corso Mazzini. The gallery was frescoed by Felice Giani and Serafino Barassi.
