= Zauli =

Zauli is an Italian surname. Notable people with the surname include:

- Bruno Zauli (1902–1963), Italian sports official
- Giuseppe Zauli (1763–1822), Italian painter and engraver
- Lamberto Zauli (born 1971), Italian footballer and manager
