= Pietro Tomba =

Italian painter (1774–1846)

Pietro Tomba (1774–1846) was an Italian painter.

He was born in Faenza. His first training was with his artist father. In 1792 he studied architecture at the Academy of Fine Arts of Bologna under Angelo Venturoli. He help design the casa Piani-Venturoli in Neoclassic style. He helped design the church of the Osservanza (1829–30), San Vitale (1831) e San Sigismondo (1836) in Faenza. He designed the church of San Pietro Apostolo, Castelbolognese. He briefly worked in Rome by Tommaso Minardi. In 1820, Tomba was made professor of architecture at the Faentine School of Design in 1820, where among his pupils were Romolo Liverani, Achille Calzi, Gaspare Mattioli, and Costantino Galli.
