= Pistocchi =

Pistocchi is an Italian surname. Notable people with the surname include:

- Francesco Antonio Pistocchi (1659–1726), Italian musician
- Giuseppe Pistocchi (1744–1814), Italian architect
