= Paolo Mei =

Italian painter

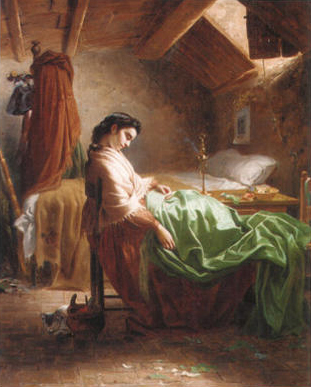

Paolo Mei (18 June 1831 – 21 March 1900) was an Italian painter active in Rome.

== Biography ==
He was born in Rome to his father, Domenico, and his mother, Matilde Farrajoni. Parish records list the name sometimes as Meo, but Mei was used throughout his life. His father died when Paolo was three years old, and his mother died when he was 19 years old; this left him inheriting little in terms of financial resources.

His initial training was under Tommaso Minardi, then a professor at the Accademia di San Luca in Rome. By 1856, he had formulated a strong friendship with the painter Cesare Fracassini, who was to help him obtain many commissions. He often also collaborated with Cesare Mariani. In 1859, he helped decorate the rooms in the Palazzo Raffaelli in Cingoli, in the province of Macerata. He also painted in Tivoli and Civitavecchia.

Among his works for churches are:

- Chapel of the Guardian Angel in the church of Santa Maria in Aquiro;
- Chapel of the crucifix in the church of Santa Lucia del Gonfalone; ceiling and lateral walls: only walls remain, depicting Madonna Addolorata.,
- Altarpiece (1869) for fourth chapel on left in the church of Santa Maria della Pace; completed a canvas of Cesare Fracassini.
- Execution of St Stefano and part of St Lawrence presents the goods of his church to the prefect of Rome for the Basilica of San Lorenzo fuori le Mura both either designs or partially completed by Fracassini before his death.

In 1860, he provided some designs for the engraver Giuseppe Marcucci. He painted a number of small canvases with scenes of life in Ancient Rome (also called Neo-Pompeian themes). In 1865, he traveled to Naples, where he made contact with Domenico Morelli. After the death of Minardi in 1871, he completed some of the frescoes (Art and Poetry) in the portico of the cemetery of Verano (Campo Verano) in Rome. Guglielmo De Sanctis completed the other two. He is buried in this cemetery. In 1893, he was admitted as a member to the Congregazione pontificia de’ Virtuosi of the Pantheon. Mei died in Rome on 21 March 1900.

== Bibliography ==
- Archivio storico del Vicariato, S. Agostino, Liber mortuorum, Roma, 1894–1922;
- Francesco Franco, PAOLO MEI (1831-1900). Notizie inedite fino al 1867, dalle lettere a Cesare Fracassini, in BTA - Bollettino Telematico dell'Arte, 13 Marzo 2008, n. 483 - ISSN 1127-4883B;
- A. Della Massea, Cesare Fracassini, ed. Roma 1956, p. 38;
- B. Magni, Le pitture del profesor Cesare Mariani in S. Lucia del Gonfalone, ed. Roma 1867, p. 13;
- A. Monti, Le pitture di S. Maria in Aquiro, in Il Buonarroti, luglio-agosto 1866, p. 141 n. 1;
- Guglielmo de Sanctis, Tommaso Minardi e il suo tempo, ed. Roma, 1900, p. 205;
- Archivio di Stato di Roma, Fondo Ovidi - Minardi, b. 15, c. 247: Sottoscrizione per il monumento del prof. Minardi;
- Ernesto Ovidi, Minardi e la sua scuola, ed. Roma 1902, p 173;
- A.M.Comanducci, s.v. in Dizionario illustrato dei Pittori, Disegnatori e Incisori Italiani Moderni e Contemporanei, ed. Milano, 1972, p. 1847;
- Entry in Treccani Encyclopedia, Dizionario Biografico degli Italiani, by Francesco Franco - volume 2073, ed. Roma, 2009.
- S. Gnisci, Mei, Paolo, s. v., in Dizionario biografico degli artisti, in La pittura in Italia. L'Ottocento, vol. II, ed. Milano, 1991, pp. 914, 915.
