= Bernardo Celentano =

Italian painter (1835–1863)

- Born: 23 February 1835; Naples, Kingdom of the Two Sicilies
- Died: 28 July 1863 (aged 28); Rome, Papal States
- Resting place: Church of Sant'Onofrio al Gianicolo
- Style: Realism

Bernardo Celentano (23 February 1835 – 28 July 1863) was an Italian painter of the 19th century, who painted historical themes in the style of Realism.

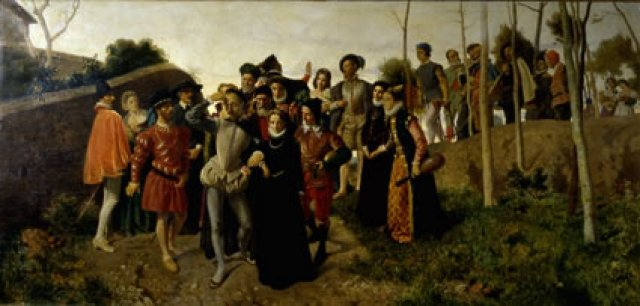
Tasso, Starting to show Madness at Bisaccia (1863), now at the Galleria Nazionale d'Arte Moderna, Rome

== Early life ==
Celentano was born in Naples, where he first trained with Luigi Stabile. He subsequently attended the Accademia di Belle Arti di Napoli, where he was instructed by Giuseppe Mancinelli. By 1860, he had moved to Rome where he had a brief and intense career.

== Career ==
He was a colleague of Domenico Morelli and Filippo Palizzi, two other Realist painters. Among his two major paintings are Tasso, Starting to show Madness at Bisaccia and The Council of Ten (Il Consiglio di Dieci). His friend, Guglielmo de Sanctis published an essay of the last days of his life, and mentions that the painters Cesare Fracassini and Paolo Mei, as well as himself, were by his bedside at the time of his demise.

The precocious death of such a talent was a cause of great distress among fellow artists. A conference in 1893 recalled his life, work, and posthumous influence.

== Death ==
He died in Rome at the age of 28 and he was buried in the church of Sant'Onofrio al Gianicolo in Rome.
