= Teatro Mancinelli =

Theatre in Orvieto, Italy

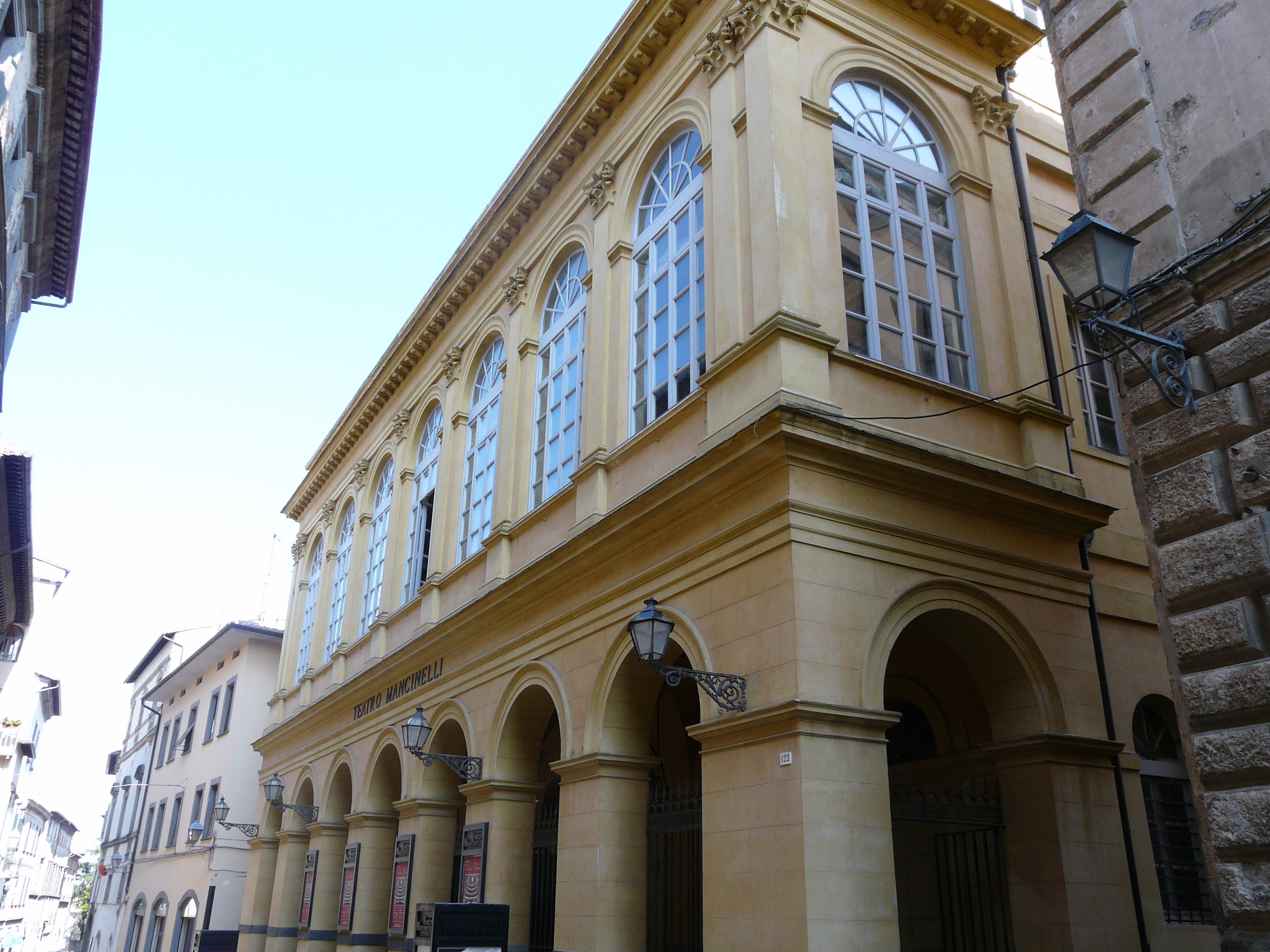
- Teatro Mancinelli
- Interactive map of Teatro Mancinelli
- Address: Corso Cavour #143; Orvieto; Italy
- Coordinates: 42.71868°N 12.11283°E

Construction
- Opened: 1866
- Rebuilt: 1993
- Architect: Virginio Vespignani

Website
- Comune Orvieto

Teatro Mancinelli is the main theater stage in Orvieto for live dramatic and musical performances.

== History and description ==
Located at the site of the former Palazzo Orienti, in 1844 a group of citizens proposed erecting a theater at this site. The project stalled, and the architect Virginio Vespignani designed and built the present structure. The theater was inaugurated on 19 May 1866 with the opera La Favorita by Donizetti. Initially the theater was dedicated initially to the muses Talia, Melpomene, and Euterpe, but in 1922 the city renamed the theater to honor two brother and fellow citizens who had gained international reputation as musicians and composers, Luigi and Marino Mancinelli.

A description of the theater in 1883 noted the entry salon was frescoed by Annibale Angelini. Some medallions were frescoed by Cesare Fracassini with portraits of famed Italian opera composers: Rossini, Bellini, Donizzetti, Verdi, Mercadante, and Pacini; poets: Metastasio, Alfieri, Goldoni, and Romani: and choreographers Rota and Viganò. Fracassini also frescoed the three muses in the proscenium. The sipario (theater curtain) was painted by Fracassini, depicting the expulsion by Belisarius of the Goths from Orvieto in 538.

Closed for some years, in 1993 a restoration of the interior was completed and the theater is the venue for drama, opera, dance and other spectacles.
