= Tommaso Dal Pozzo =

Italian painter

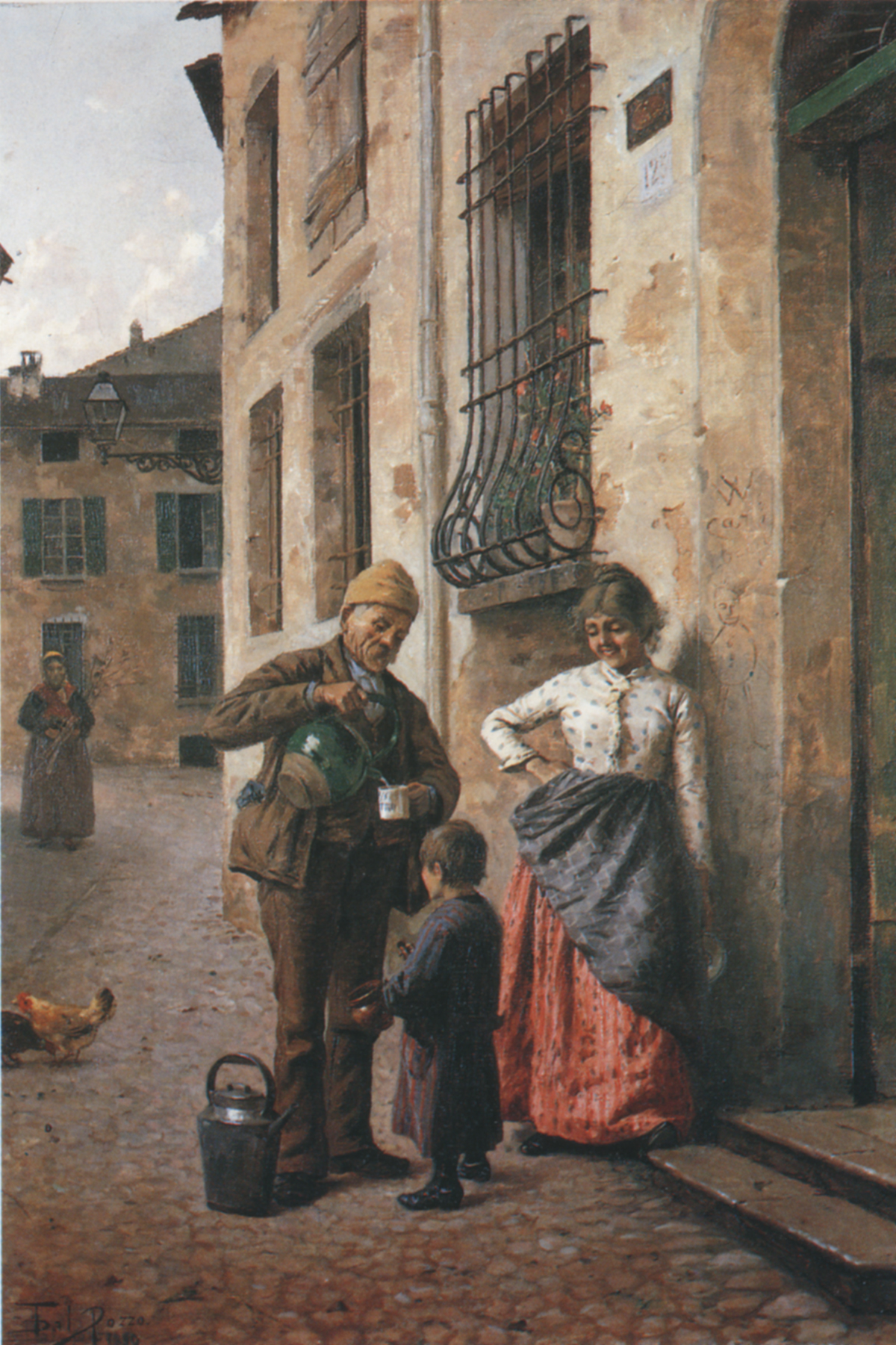
Tommaso Dal Pozzo

Tommaso Dal Pozzo, also known as Tomaso Dalpozzo (3 November 1862 - 21 February 1906) was an Italian painter and ceramist, mainly depicting landscapes and genre scenes.

== Biography ==
He was born in Faenza and trained under Farina and Antonio Berti at the local Academy of Fine Arts. He began his career as a painter of maiolica, and in 1887 submitted work to an exhibition in Faenza. As a painter, he submitted the work Alle Balze, moto rivoluzionario del 1845 to the 1888 Esposizione Emiliana in Bologna.

He was one of the painters who frescoed the villa "il Palazione" in Solarolo (no longer existing). He also painted for the burial chapel for the Graziaini e Pancrazi families in the Cemetery of the Osservanza in Faenza. In 1897, he helped decorate the Capella dell Beata Virgene della Providenza in the church of Santa Margherita of Faenza. He also frescoed (1898 - 1899) in the Chapel of San Pier Damiano in the Faenza Cathedral. He frescoed (1899-1900) in the chapel of the Santissimo Crocifisso of the church of the Cappuccini in Faenza.

He worked as an illustrator for journals. He was known as a portrait artist. He was briefly director of the Fabbriche Riunite. He served during the last year of his life as director of the Pinacoteca and Museo Civico di Faenza. He died in Faenza. During life, he was awarded a number of awards at exhibitions including:

- Prize for two portraits in ceramic, Accademia di Belle Arti di Ravenna (1887)
- Prize, Esposizione di Bologna (1888) for Marina and Nevicato (oil paintings)
- Admitted to Concorso Curlandese della Prima Triennale di Milan (1891)
- Silver medal, Ministero della Pubblica Istruzione, Esposizione di Modena (1892);
- Silver medal, Esposizione di Rimini (1901);
- Gold medal, Esposizione di Lugo (1901);
- Silver and bronze medal, Esposizione di Imola (1903);
- Silver medal, Esposizione di Ravenna (1904).
