= Luigi Cochetti =

Italian painter (1802–1884)

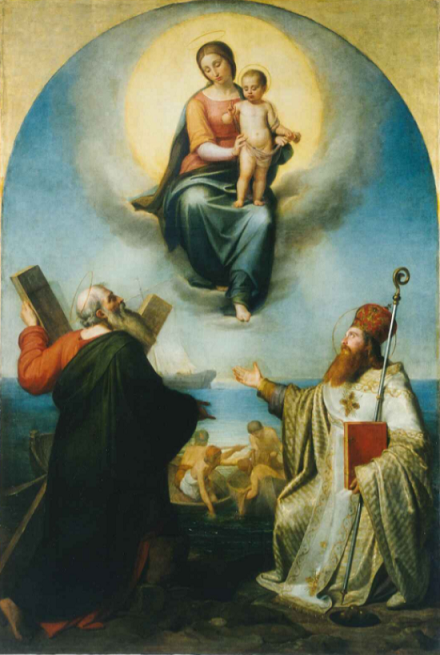
Madonna del Ponte

Luigi Cochetti (2 October 1802 – 6 January 1884) was an Italian painter.

He was born and died in Rome, where he was a pupil of Tommaso Minardi at the Accademia di San Luca in Rome. He became a professor of painting at the academy. The Accademia was then under the direction of Vincenzo Cammuccini. He painted large allegories for the ceiling and theater curtain of the Teatro dell'Aquila in Fermo, depicting respectively the Invocation at Olympus with Jove, Juno, three graces and six dancing nocturnal hours listening to the music of Apollo and Harmony consigns its scepter to the Genius of Fermo.
