= Virginia Mariani =

Italian painter (1824–1898)

Virginia Barlocci Mariani
- Born: Virginia Barlocci; 1824; Rome, Papal States (now Italy)
- Died: 1898 (aged 73–74); Rome, Italy
- Known for: Painting
- Spouse: 1) Bernardino Riccardi - 2) Cesare Mariani

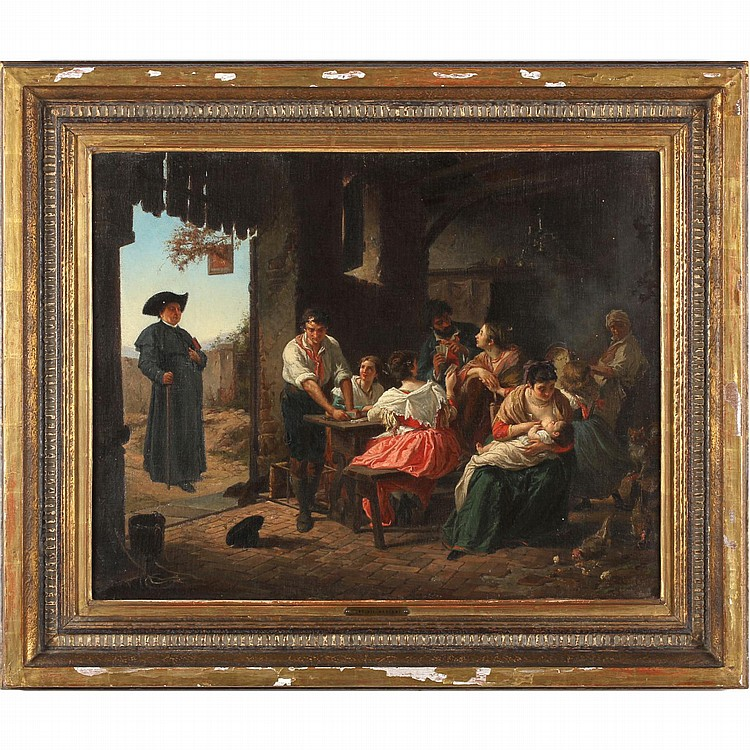
A painting by Mariani, which is a copy of her husband Cesare Mariani's work

Virginia Mariani, born Virginia Barlocci, (1824–1898) was an Italian painter, active in Rome. She was known for her portraits in watercolors and oils. She also worked in ceramics.

== Biography ==
Virginia Barlocci studied in Rome with her first husband Bernardino Riccardi, who died in 1854. At the 1875 Mostra provinciale of Perugia, she displayed life-size half-busts. She gained an honorary associate membership in the Umbrian Academy of Fine Arts. She was also an honorary associate of the Accademia dei Virtuosi of the Pantheon. Mrs Mariani worked in ceramics. She was a private tutor in the arts, and also taught at various Roman institutes and was inspector of the municipal schools. Her husband was the painter Cesare Mariani. She died in Rome in 1898.
