= Teatro dell'Aquila, Fermo =

Coordinates: 43°9′37.3766″N 13°43′3.6120″E

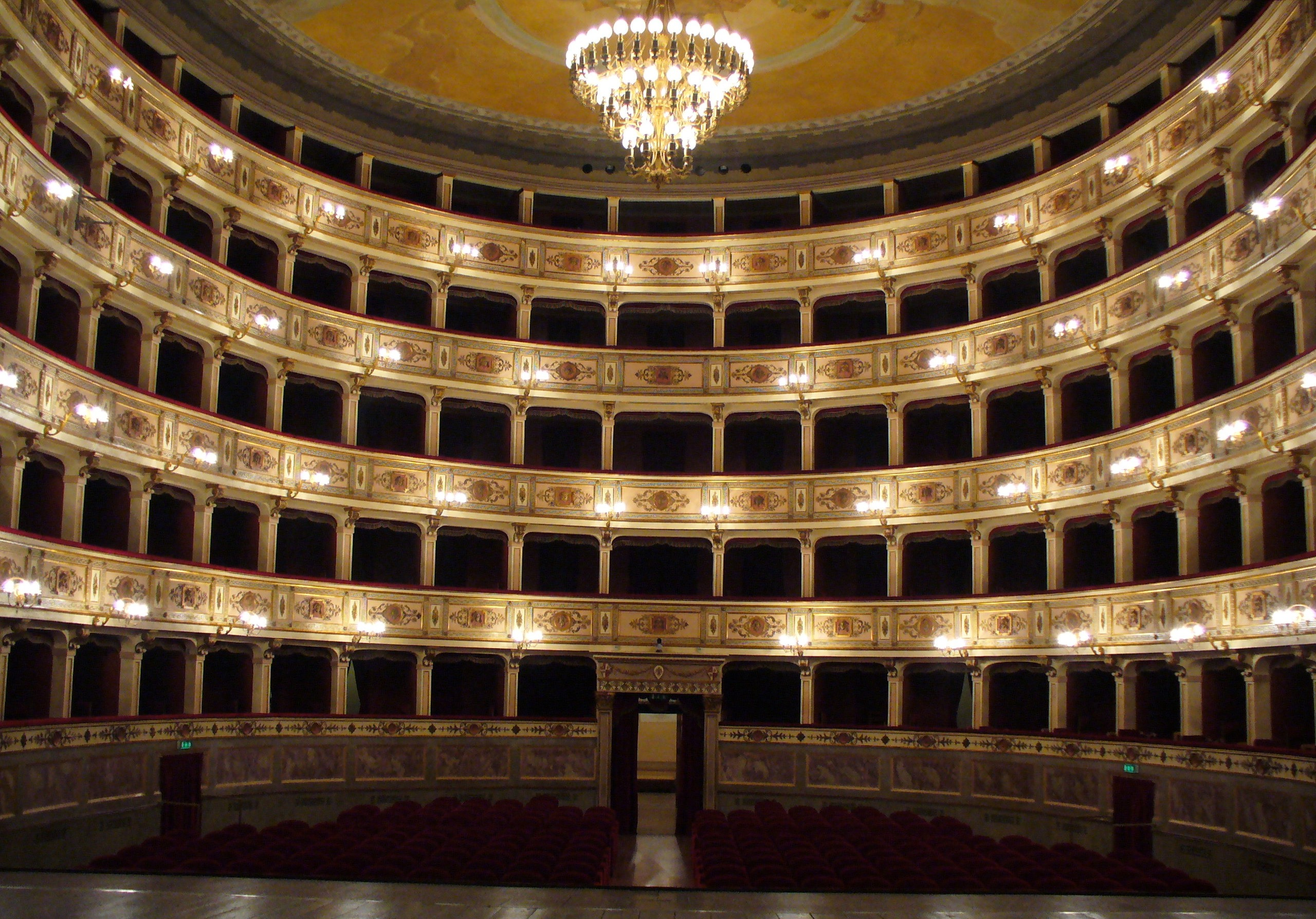
- Interior of the theater
- Interactive map of Teatro dell'Aquila, Fermo
- Address: Fermo; Italy

UNESCO World Heritage Site
- Official name: Teatro dell'Aquila
- Part of: The system of Italian-style condominio theatres of the 18th and 19th centuries in Central Italy
- Criteria: Cultural: iii
- Reference: 1762
- Inscription: 2026 (48th Session)

The Teatro dell'Aquila is the town's opera house located on Via Mazzini in Fermo, region of Marche, Italy.

The building was built starting in 1780 and completed in 1790, was based on designs by Cosimo Morelli; the prior theater, located in what is now the Sala dei Ritratti in the Palazzo dei Priori and built of wood, had burned in a fire. The first performance here was on 26 September 1790. The theater has 124 boxes over five orders tall. The ceiling frescoes were completed by Luigi Cochetti, and depict The Gods of Olympus, including Jove, Juno, three graces, and six Nightime hours (dancing) listen to the Song of Apollo. The theater curtain was also painted by Cochetti, and depicts Armonia che consegna la cetra al genio fermano [Harmony delivering the lyre to the genius of Fermo]. Other paintings now in the entrance, were painted in 1830 by Alessandro Sanquirico. The theater underwent restoration in 1997. The Teatro dell'Aquila now takes part in presenting performances by the Rete Lirica delle Marche.

In July 2026, the condominio theatres of the 18th and 19th centuries in Central Italy (including Teatro dell'Aquila) were designated by UNESCO as a World Heritage Site.
