= Francesco Jacovacci =

Italian painter

Francesco Jacovacci (1840 — 1908) was an Italian painter, often painting historical canvases and costume genre pieces.

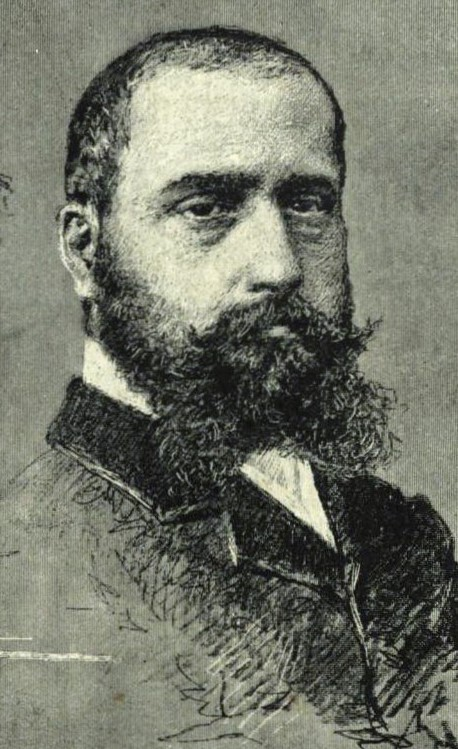
Francesco Jacovacci

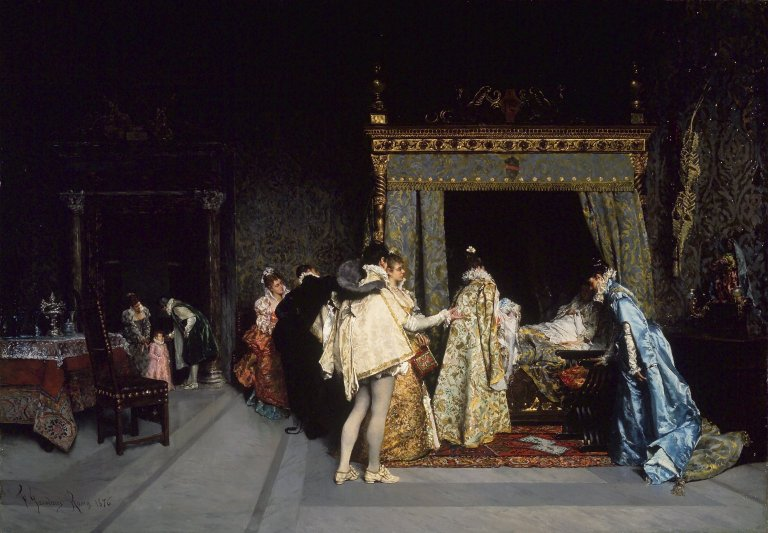
Birth of a Prince, 1876, Brooklyn Museum

Jacovacci was born in Rome. He was a pupil of Alessandro Capalti and Alessandro Marini. He collaborated with Cesare Fracassini in completing the frescoes for the church of San Lorenzo fuori le Mura. His paintings were often sold through the Goupil gallery.

Jacovacci won an award at 1880 Turin National Exposition with his painting of Michelangelo davanti dalla salma di Vittoria Colonna (Michelangelo before the body of his mistress Vittoria Colonna), currently held by the Capodimonte Museum, Naples. Among Jacovacci's other works are The Gondola (1876).

Jacovacci died in Rome in 1908.

== Gallery ==
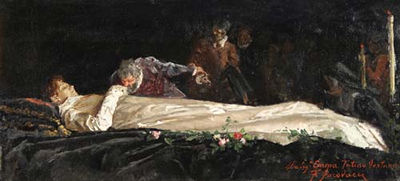
Michelangelo davanti dalla salma di Vittoria Colonna, 1880

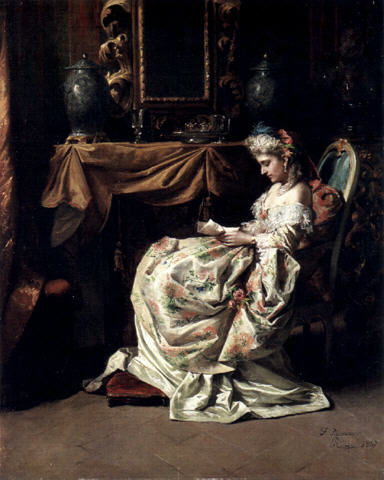
The Letter, 1889

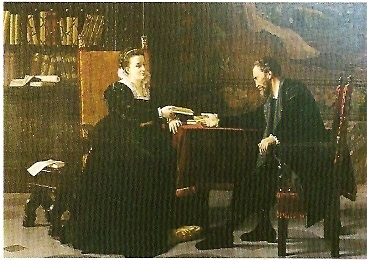
Michelangelo Meets Vittoria Colonna

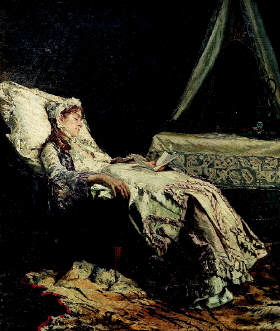
Addio al Passato, 1877, GAM, Milan

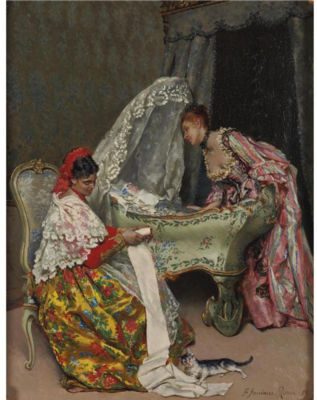
In the Nursery

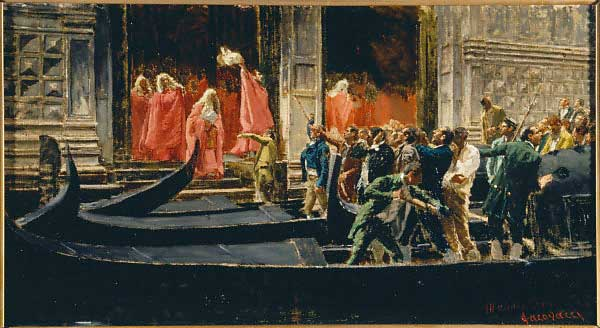
Last Day of the Venetian Republic, 1888
