= Madonna delle Grazie, Teramo =

Catholic church in Teramo, Italy

Coordinates: 42°39′25.3″N 13°42′41.4″E

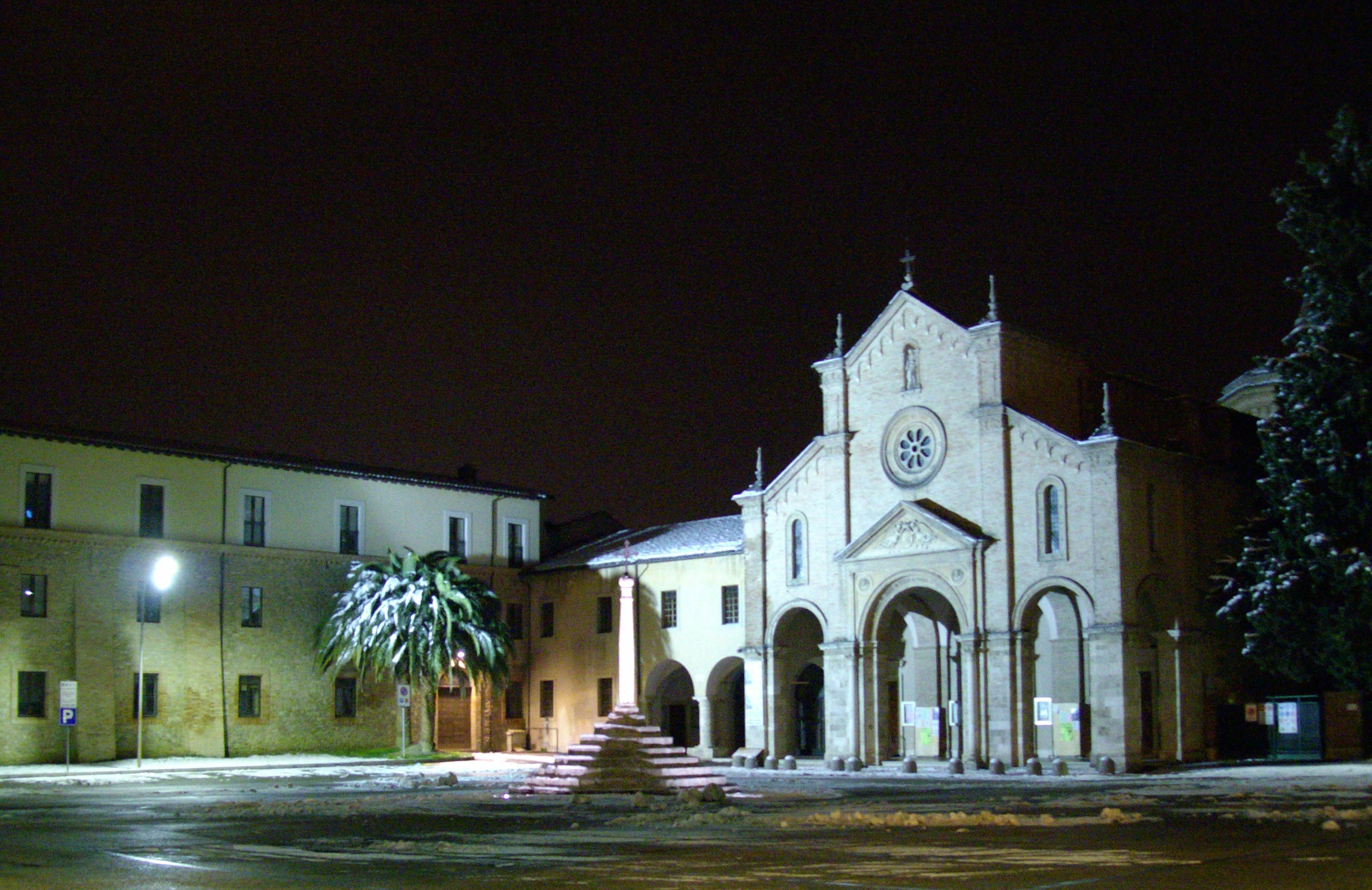
Madonna delle Grazie as night

The Madonna delle Grazie is a Romanesque-style, Roman Catholic church, or sanctuary, in the town of Teramo, Province of Teramo, Region of Abruzzo, Italy.

== History ==
A church at the site, dedicated to Sant'Angelo delle Donne, and attached to a Benedictine order monastery is documented from the 12th century. In 1448, the site was assigned to the Franciscan order. The church was refurbished in the 1600s and 1800s, with the last alteration in 1892-1900 restoring an appearance befitting a Renaissance interior.

In the late 19th century, the interior was frescoed by Cesare Mariani. The main altar has a polychrome statue of the Madonna and Child attributed to Silvestro dall'Aquila. A restored 15th century fresco of an Enthroned Madonna delle Gracia with Child is attributed to the school of Carlo Crivelli. Attached to the church is the 12th century cloister.
