= Fracassini =

Fracassini is an Italian surname. Notable people with the surname include:

- Ambrosio Fracassini, O.P. (died 1663), Italian Roman Catholic Bishop of Pula
- Cesare Fracassini (1838–1868), Italian painter
