= San Pietro Apostolo, Castelbolognese =

Church building in Biancanigo, Italy

San Pietro Apostolo is a Roman Catholic church located on Via Biancanigo #1631 in the town of Castel Bolognese, in the region of Emilia Romagna, Italy.

== History ==
A church at the site was documented dating back to 1289. It was destroyed by an earthquake on April 14, 1781. It was rebuilt anew between 1818 and 1820 by the architect Pietro Tomba. A flood of the River Senio in the late 1940s, destroyed that church, and it was reconstituted in its prior design after 1949. In 1983, it underwent a renovation.
