= Pasquale Saviotti =

Italian painter

Pasquale Saviotti (1792–1855) was an Italian painter and engraver who worked in a Neoclassical style.

He was born in Faenza, and initially studied design and engraving under Giuseppe Zauli in the Liceo Dipartimentale del Rubicone in Faenza. He later became an instructor at the school. In 1830, he moved to Florence where he developed a career as a painter. One of the pupils of both Zauli and Saviotti was Gaspare Mattioli.
