= Dionigi Strocchi =

Italian writer

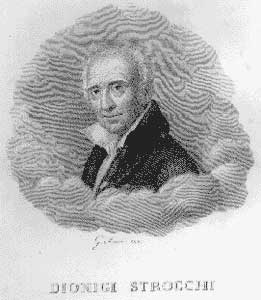
Strocchi on the frontispiece of the Faenza edition of his Poesie greche e latine volgarizzate

Dionigi Strocchi (6 January 1762 – 15 April 1850) was an Italian educator, writer, classical scholar and translator.

== Life ==
After studying in a seminary, he moved to Rome in 1783, where he later graduated in jurisprudence. In 1790 he found a job in the Secretariat of Latin Letters in the Holy College. He then returned to his birthplace at the end of the 18th century to support the Cisalpine Republic and its successor the Napoleonic Kingdom of Italy, gaining important jobs in both administrations;. Between 1806 and 1809 he was rector and eloquence lecturer at the Evangelista Torricelli state gymnasium in the city.

He was a friend of Vincenzo Monti, Ugo Foscolo, Paolo Costa, Giovanni Paradisi and Ennio Quirino Visconti and established the neoclassical literary school in Faenza. When the Napoleonic regime fell he returned to the Papal States, taking refuge in San Marino and briefly imprisoned in Bologna. He did not oppose the Restoration and composed a hymn in honour pope Pius IX and his election in 1846. Pius made him a senator in 1848, two years before his death.

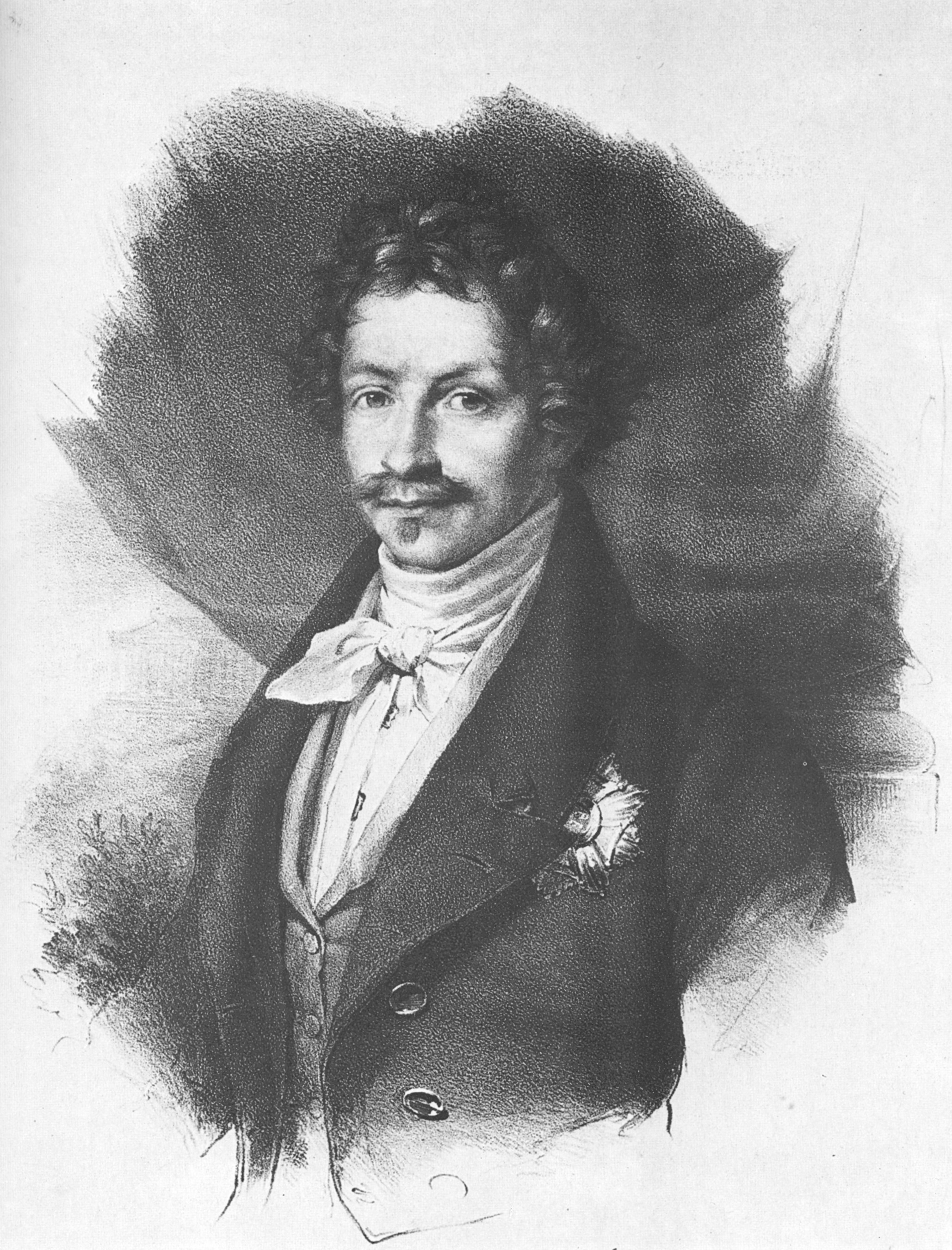
Louis I of Bavaria, whose poems were translated by Dionigi Strocchi

He wrote his own poems but is better known as a translator, particularly for his metrical translation of Callimachus's hymns in 1805, which Giosuè Carducci adjudged to be finer than the originals. He also produced metrical translations of Virgil's Georgics in 1831 and his Eclogues in 1834. At the time of his death he was working on a version of Louis I of Bavaria's poems - this was published posthumously in 1856, including two previously published translations of 1836 and 1844.

== Works ==
=== Biographies ===
- De vita Alexandri Albani cardinalis, Romæ, in typographeo Paleariniano, 1790.

=== Poems and hymns ===
- Versi del cavaliere Dionigi Strocchi, Bologna, Tipografia Nobili, 1820.
- Poesie e prose italiane e latine del cav. Dionigi Strocchi faentino, 2 voll., Faenza, Montanari e Marabini, 1830.
- Raccolta di versi in vario metro italiani e latino del ch. cav. Dionigi Strocchi, Ravenna, Tipografia del ven. Seminario arciv., 1845.
- Inno a Pio nono, Faenza, per Pietro Conti all'Apollo, 1847.

=== Scholarship and letters ===
- Discorsi accademici del cav. Dionigi Strocchi faentino, Ravenna, presso A. Roveri e figli, 1836.
- Elogi e discorsi accademici del cavaliere Dionigi Strocchi faentino, Parma, Pietro Fiaccadori, 1840. (Google Books)
- Lettere edite e inedite del cavaliere Dionigi Strocchi ed altre inedite a lui scritte da uomini illustri raccolte e annotate a cura di Giovanni Ghinassi, 2 voll., Faenza, Conti, 1868 (Second volume on Google Books)

=== Classical translations ===
- Inni a Venere tradotti dal greco dall'abate Dionigi Strocchi, Firenze, per Gaetano Cambiagi stampatore reale, 1790.
- Callimaco, Inni recati in rima da Dionigi Strocchi faentino, Milano, dalla tipografia di Francesco Sonzogno di Gio. Batt. stampatore librajo, 1805.
- Virgil, Le Georgiche volgarizzate da Dionigi Strocchi, Prato, presso i fratelli Giachetti, 1831.
- Virgil, La prima egloga volgarizzata dal cav. Dionigi Strocchi, Milano. Tipografia Fontana, 1832.
- Virgil, Le Buccoliche volgarizzate da Dionigi Strocchi, Pesaro, pei tipi di Annesio Nobili, 1834.
- Poesie greche e latine volgarizzate dal cavaliere Dionigi Strocchi faentino, Faenza, Conti, 1843; Nuova edizione, Torino, Res, 1995. ISBN 88-85323-17-0.

=== German translations ===
- Louis I of Bavaria, Poesie di S. M. re di Baviera recate in metro italiano dal cavaliere Dionigi Strocchi, Faenza, presso Pietro Conti all'Apollo, 1836 (translation attempt).
- Louis I of Bavaria, Poesie di S. M. Lodovico re di Baviera recate in metro italiano dal cavaliere Dionigi Strocchi, Fano, Tip. Lana, 1844 (translation attempt).
- Louis I of Bavaria, Poesie di Lodovico re di Baviera recate in versi italiani dal cav. Dionigi Strocchi, ora per la prima volta date in luce per cura di Giovanni Ghinassi, Prato, per Ranieri Guasti, 1856 (original complete edition, published posthumously).

== Bibliography ==
- Natali, Giulio (1936). "STROCCHI, Dionigi". Enciclopedia Italiana. Vol. 32. Rome: Istituto dell'Enciclopedia Italiana.
- Goffis, Cesare Federico (1970). "STROCCHI, Dionigi". Enciclopedia Dantesca. Roma: Istituto dell'Enciclopedia Italiana.
