= Giordano Bianchi Dottula =

Italian writer and politician

Giordano Bianchi Dottula (31 January 1775 in Montrone – 19 February 1846 in Naples) was an Italian writer and politician.

== Life ==
He initially studied under the Piarist father Ermenegildo Guarnieri before moving from Naples to Rome. Passionate about classical studies, he was a member of the purist school, a teacher of Basilio Puoti and a friend of Vincenzo Monti, Ugo Foscolo, Pietro Giordani and other noted writers of the time.

In 1799 he joined the revolutionaries who set up the anti-Bourbon Partenopean Republic, taking the pseudonym Timoleone Bianchi after Timoleon, the ancient Greek killer of tyrants. He was an official in Gioacchino Murat's administration and in 1800 fought in the battle of Marengo. When Murat became king of Naples in 1808 he made Bianchi his court chamberlain and president of the council of the Province of Bari.

Following the restoration of the Bourbons to Naples in 1815, he endured a period of exile in France and Switzerland before eventually reclaiming residence in Bari.. He quickly took on major posts in the Kingdom of the Two Sicilies, including in 1831 Intendent of the Province of Bari and then member of the Council of State in Naples. In 1821 he became marquess of Montrone. On 21 May 1839 he wrote from Bari to the Minister of Police to inform him that he was keeping Bari under surveillance for anyone wearing a straw hat with a green ribbon, the code sign for members of the La Giovine Italia conspiracy.
