= Giuseppe Pistocchi =

Italian architect

- Born: 12 January 1744; Faenza, Papal States
- Died: 20 August 1814 (aged 70); Faenza, Kingdom of Italy
- Employer: University of Pavia
- Known for: Architecture
- Movement: Neoclassicism

Giuseppe Pistocchi (12 January 1744 – 20 August 1814) was an Italian architect of the Neoclassic style, active mainly near his natal city of Faenza. Pistocchi was a fervent Bonapartist, and most of his later projects were grandiose public schemes for the Napoleonic government in Milan, which, although unexecuted, reveal his singular personality more clearly than his earlier work in Romagna.

== Biography ==
=== Early career ===
Pistocchi was born in Faenza. His father, a sculptor and stuccoist, sent him to work with the architect Giuseppe Boschi (il Carloncino). Pistocchi worked in Faenza before completing his studies in Rome, where he worked after 1760 with Carlo Murena. He was also influenced by Pietro Camporese, absorbing the spirit of the Cinquecento revival then taking place. In 1766 he restored the Palazzo Apostolico in Pesaro, and he also became chief architect and engineer for public works in the Romagna region. He supervised many schemes and built the church of San Matteo, the Palazzo Conti and Palazzo Gessi, all in Pesaro; from 1780 to 1782 he built the dome of Ravenna Cathedral.

Pistocchi’s developing style can best be seen in the Teatro Comunale (now Teatro Masini; 1780–87), Faenza, where he designed a giant order of columns in the auditorium, rising through two storeys, surmounted by statues of the Muses and pagan gods. This complex articulation marked a change from the traditional use of uniform balconies, investing the individual boxes with a differentiated character. Other work of c. 1790 included Santa Maria degli Angeli, Pesaro, and the Palazzo Grossi at Senigallia. At the same time he submitted a competition design (unexecuted) for the Teatro La Fenice, Venice.

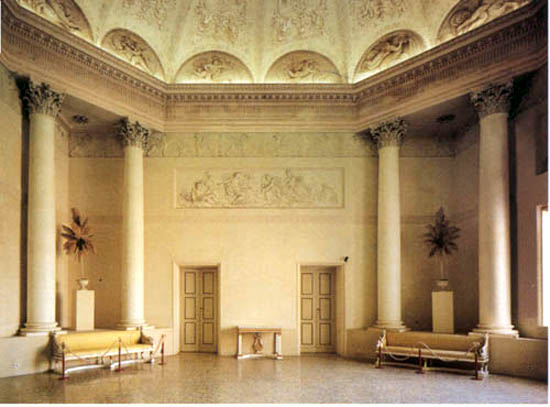
Hall of Palazzo Milzetti

Pistocchi’s drawings are lost, but a written description of the scheme refers again to a giant order of 12 columns in the auditorium, between which the boxes were to be located. In an important visit to Naples in this period, Pistocchi worked with Luigi Vanvitelli, the court architect then completing the Royal Palace of Caserta. His influence on Pistocchi was significant, and on returning to Faenza Pistocchi built the Palazzo Milzetti, Palazzo Bandini and his own house in a Neoclassical style.

=== Maturity ===
The second stage of Pistocchi’s career began in 1797 when the Napoleonic Cisalpine Republic was proclaimed, with Milan as its capital. Pistocchi moved to Milan in 1801 and remained there until his death. He was appointed Inspector-General of military bases for the Rubicon Department and was also hydraulic engineer responsible for the Naviglio Canal. He later became architect to the Palazzo Reale, Mantua (1812), and professor of architecture at University of Pavia (1814).

The years after 1800 were vital for Italian Neoclassicism, and Pistocchi’s later career cannot be separated from that of Giovanni Antonio Antolini: both were interpreters of the revolutionary spirit, but with different temperaments and architectural tastes. In 1796, for example, Antolini had designed a Doric triumphal arch (built 1799; destr.) in Faenza, which was correctly classical but timid; Pistocchi produced a rival scheme (unexecuted) in a simple, minimal style influenced by Claude Nicolas Ledoux. Pistocchi’s first project in Milan (c. 1802) was a design (unexecuted) for a commemorative column to mark Napoleon’s victory at Marengo. Again Antolini produced a scheme (unexecuted) that was erudite and scholastic but rather lifeless. Pistocchi’s design was a bizarre, neo-Baroque proposal consisting of a deeply moulded column with a spiral stair wrapped around the full height of the exterior.

His next Milanese design, again c. 1802 (unexecuted), was for a new barracks, a curious, eclectic exercise in neo-Gothic with steeply pointed arches. The overall appearance is monotonous, however, with the grafting of Neoclassical formality on to an alien form. The differences between Pistocchi’s and Antolini’s approaches are again apparent in their unexecuted designs for the Foro Bonaparte, the great open space next to the Sforza Castle, Milan’s traditional site for great public festivals. Antolini’s scheme (1801) took the form of a vast, circular piazza surrounded by colonnades and forming a gateway into the city from France – a very Napoleonic vision. Pistocchi’s project (c. 1805) proposed the destruction of the castle and its replacement by a great new royal palace. The latter was designed in detail after 1805, with a grandiose façade having two great superimposed orders of paired columns and strong rustication. Although loosely modelled on the Royal Palace of Caserta, it was richer in its modelling.

Among several other unexecuted Milanese projects, Pistocchi designed three schemes for the city’s gates. For the Porta Marengo he produced a strong, simple design, again with powerful rustication, similar to his Faenza arch, but Luigi Cagnola’s scheme (built 1801–14) was preferred. In 1808 he produced a design for the Porta Sempione, although Cagnola’s was already under construction (from 1807). Pistocchi’s scheme is massive and simple, apart from a curious oriental decorative frieze, crenellation and corner motifs. His last gateway project was the Porta Orientale (1811), which was intended as a monument to Napoleon. It is finely proportioned and purely classical except for the pointed, Gothic form of the arch itself.

Pistocchi also produced two unexecuted designs for the Piazza del Duomo, the symbolic heart of Milan. His first scheme rationalized the piazza with a great colonnade forming three sides of the square, the cathedral forming the fourth. The new building, developed to house the Councils of the Republic, had a dignified, classical form, with a ground-floor colonnade and three storeys of regular fenestration above. The second version was a continuous semicircular structure, with a larger, more imposing colonnade facing the cathedral.

Other unbuilt Milanese projects included a theatre and a grandiose design (1813) for the Moncenisio monument, celebrating Napoleon’s victory at Würtchen. It took the form of a giant barracks to house 14,000 men, its overall form strongly reminiscent of the Colosseum in Rome. The design, one of Pistocchi’s last projects, is in the style of Étienne-Louis Boullée in its scale. Pistocchi’s many notable unbuilt Milanese projects are inseparable from the political events of the era. His design philosophy, sometimes eclectic in reinterpreting the Classical past, contrasted sharply with Antolini’s and reflected a more complex, imaginative personality. Attracted to Milan by the spirit of the age, he had only a short period in which his creative ideas could be expressed before they were overtaken by political events and his own death.

== Bibliography ==
- Morri, Antonio (1839). Biografia di Giuseppe Pistocchi. Forlì: Hercolani.
- Golfieri, Ennio (1939). Architetture neoclassiche di Giuseppe Pistocchi faentino (1744-1814). Milano: Tip. A. Lucini.
- Franco Bertoni, ed. (1979). Giuseppe Pistocchi: inventario dei disegni e annessioni al catalogo delle opere. Faenza: Comune di faenza.
- Galeotti Pedulli, Livietta; De Angelis, Carlo; Mercatali, Claudio (2017). La nuova chiesa di San Lorenzo in Marradi: i progetti di Bernardo Fallani e Giuseppe Pistocchi, con documenti inediti sulla ricostruzione settecentesca della chiesa di S. Lorenzo. Marradi.
