= Cesare Fracassini =

Italian painter (1838–1868)

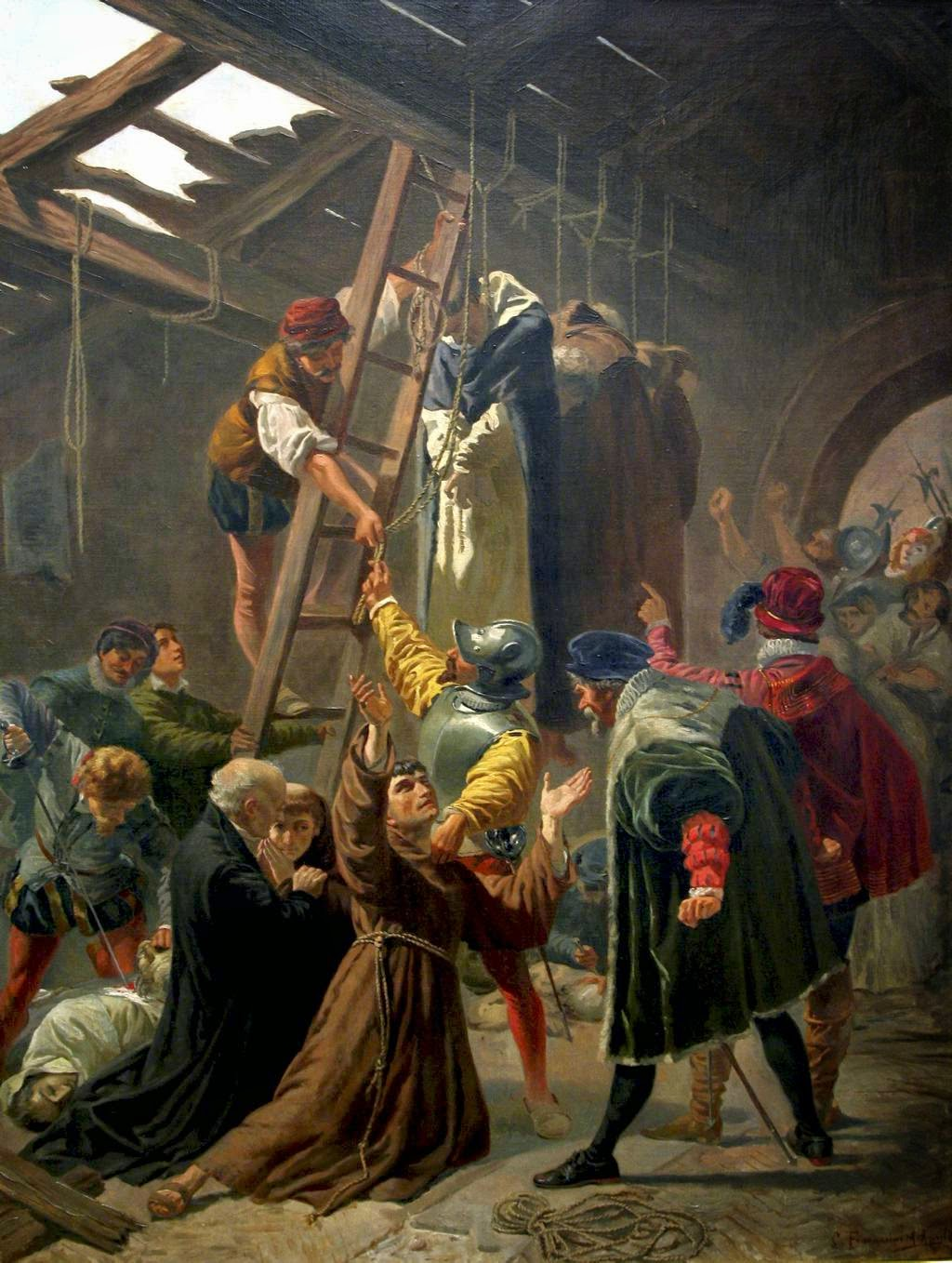
The Martyrs of Gorkum, now in the Vatican Museums

Cesare Fracassini (or Fracassi; December 18, 1838 – December 13, 1868) was an Italian painter, mainly of large mythologic or religious topics.

== Biography ==
While he was born to Paolo Serafini, originally from Orvieto; his father died when he was an infant and his mother remarried with a Domenico Fracassini. Cesare was born in Rome, and studied painting there with either Tommaso Minardi, or his pupils, before enrolling in the Accademia di San Luca, where he executed several frescoes for San Lorenzo fuori le Mura. He lived alongside the painter Cesare Mariani as a young man. He often collaborated or obtained commissions with his friend Paolo Mei, as well as a colleague of Guglielmo de Sanctis (a pupil of Minardi) and Bernardo Celentano. He died in 1868. One of his most important pictures is The Martyrs of Gorinchem (also called Canisio e i Martiri del Giappone), painted for a beatification ceremony in the Vatican.

In 1857, he was awarded first prize at the Concorso Clementino. Among his works:

- St Jerome, church of San Sebastian on via Appia
- Daphne and Chloe for an exposition in Florence
- Numa takes the counsel of the Egerian Nymph (1861), sipario (stage curtain) for the Teatro Argentina in Rome
- Apollo and Phaeton with the Solar chariot (1862), sipario for the Teatro Apollo in Rome
- Belisarius liberates Orvieto from the Goths sipario for Teatro Mancinelli, Orvieto
- Canvases for San Lorenzo fuori la Mura. Fracassini was admired for his speed of painting.
- Madonna del suffragio for a church in Albano
- The Blessed Alacoque
- Madonna degli Angeli
- Portrait of Berchmans
