= Guglielmo de Sanctis =

Italian painter

Guglielmo de Sanctis (March 8, 1829 – 1911) was an Italian painter.

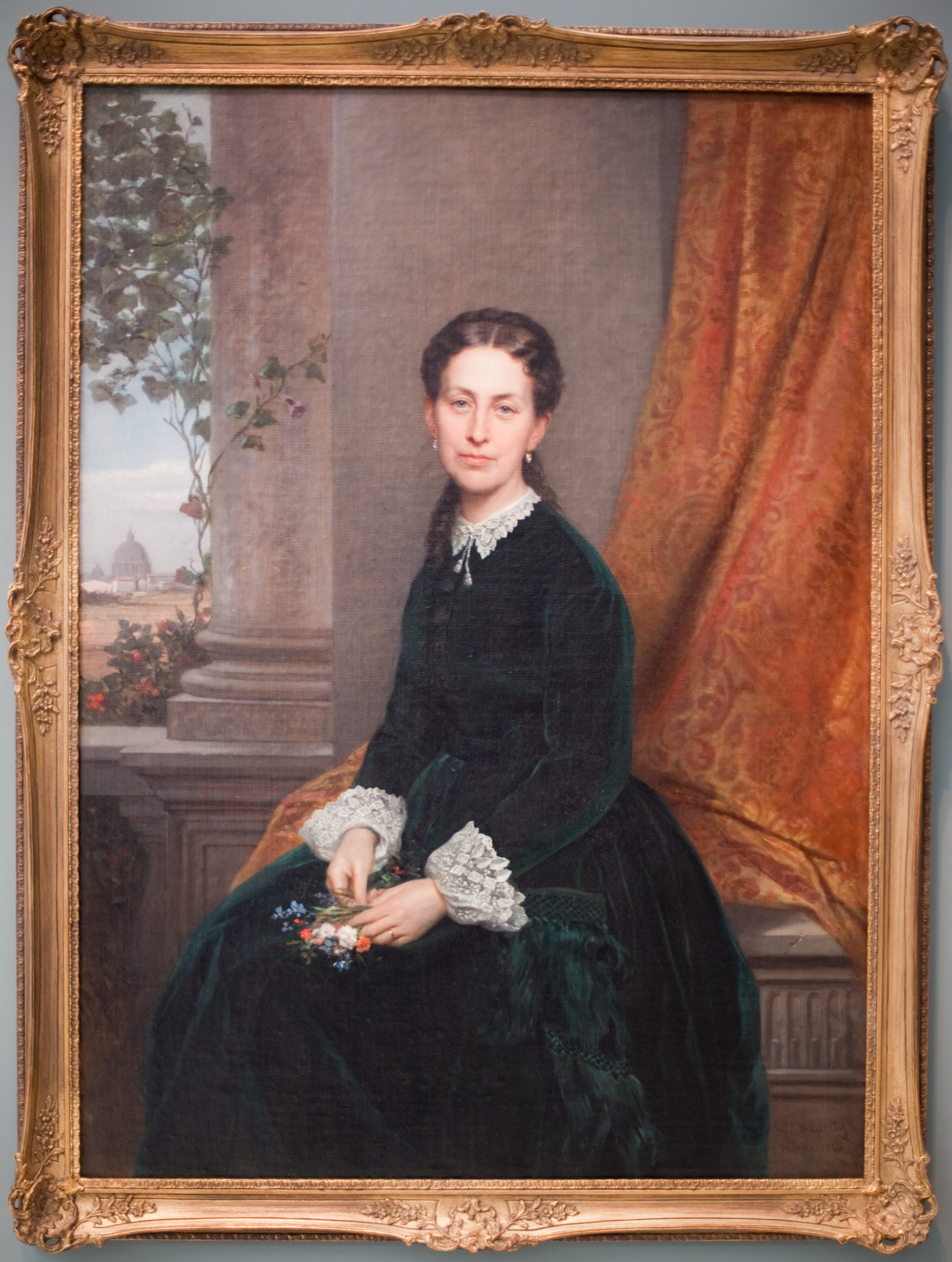
Mrs. Cleveland (1868), Carnegie Museum of Art in Pittsburgh, Pennsylvania

He was a pupil of Tommaso Minardi at the Accademia di San Luca in Rome, and wrote a biography about his teacher. He also spent some time in the studio of Cesare Marianecci in Florence.

Early in his career, he painted religious and historic themes, in a style highly influenced by his master's Purismo movement, an Italianate incarnation of the Nazarene movement. Later in life, he dedicated himself to the more profitable career as portraitist; among his subjects were King Umberto I of Italy and his wife Margherita of Savoy; the Emperor of Brazil; Napoleon Carlo Bonaparte (Napoléon Joseph Charles Paul Bonaparte?); the playwright Giacinto Gallina; Count Terenzo Mamiani; Antonio Rosmini; N. Tommasso; the art writer Pietro Selvatico; the politician Vincenzo Gioberti; the merchant Giovan Pietro Vieusseux; the diplomat Costantino Nigra; Gioachino Rossini; and many prominent Italian aristocrat and fellow artists including Filippo Palizzi and Bernardo Celentano.

Among his religious paintings was a Visitation for the church of Guadalupa (1854), a Conference of St Vincenzo de' Paoli for the church of Santissima Trinità (1855) near Montecitorio, and frescoes for the church of San Paolo (1860) depicting St Paul's Sermon in the Synagogue and St Paul in Damascus. He also painted a Sermon of St Francesco di Sales for the cathedral of Porto Maurizio and biblical subjects for the Hospital of Santo Spirito e Fatebenefratelli in Rome.

In 1865 he exhibited a large historical canvas depicting Michelangelo and Francesco Ferrucci now in the Civic Museum of Turin. He gained the commission of painting genre scenes in the gallery of the Castle of Rivoli. he was awarded a prize at the exposition in Rome of 1874. He also painted a Galileo demonstrates the use of a telescope to Venetian Signoria (circa 1867) and a canvas depicting Donna Olimpia Pamphili, sent to the International Exposition in Berlin in 1891 (now in Galleria Nazionale d'Arte Moderna in Rome).

He became an honorary member of the Academia di San Luca, and received from the government posts to judge or represent the country at many art exhibitions at home and abroad. In 1901, he published a book of essays titled Memorie: studi dal vero. Among the topics were Gioacchino Rossini; Aleardo Aleardi; Giacomo Leopardi; Alessandro Manzoni; Michelangelo; the Exposition of Milan in 1872; Bernardo Celentano; Exposition of Antwerp in 1885; Cesare Maccari; Francesco Podesti; and Agli alunni delle scuole d'arte applicata all' industria e alcune poesie.
