= Tommaso Minardi =

Italian painter (1787–1871)

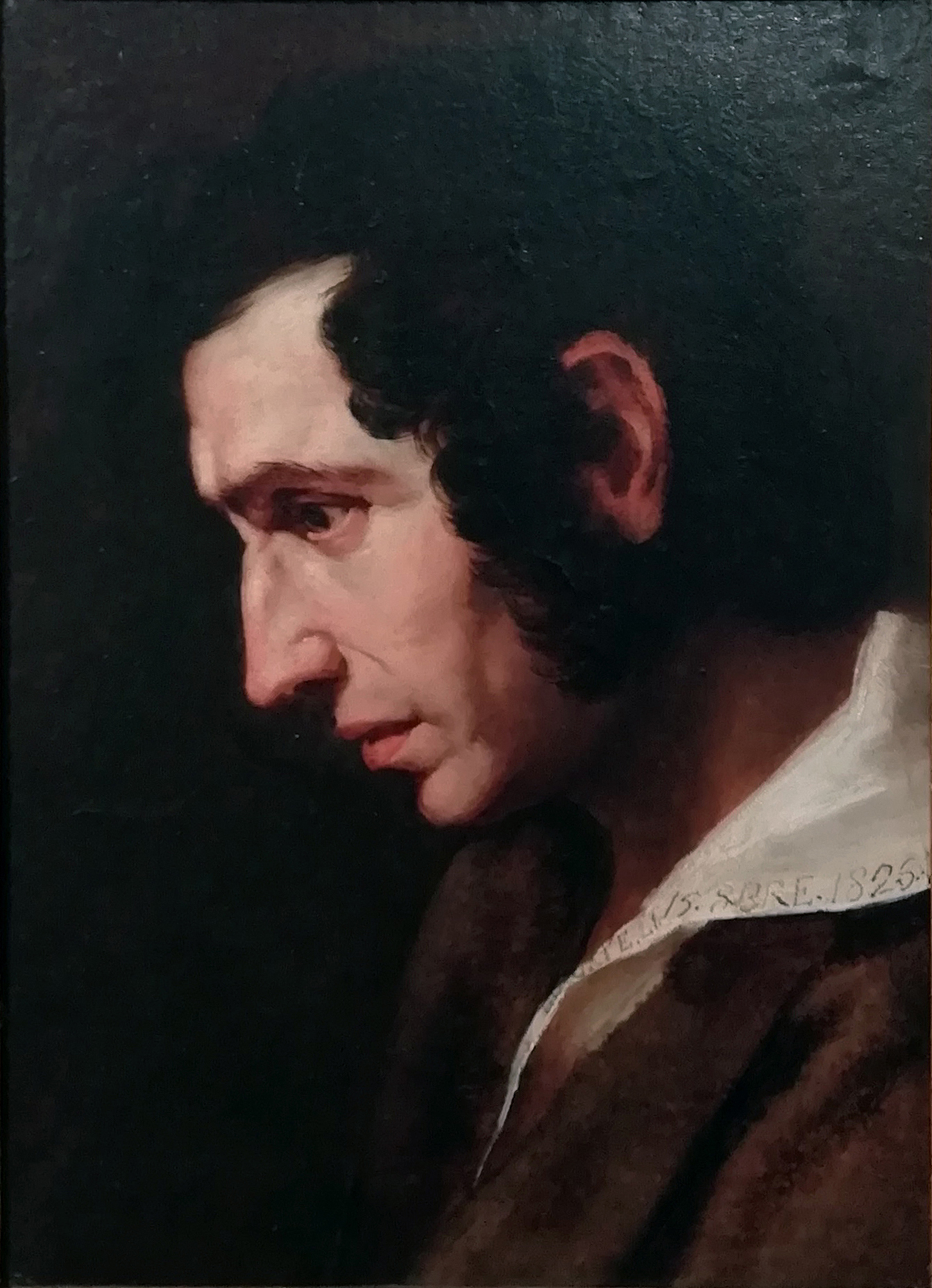
Portrait of Tommaso Minardi (1825) by Salvatore Lo Forte

Tommaso Minardi (December 4, 1787 – January 12, 1871) was an Italian painter and author on art theory, active in Faenza, Rome, Perugia, and other towns. He painted in styles that transitioned from Neoclassicism to Romanticism.

== Biography ==
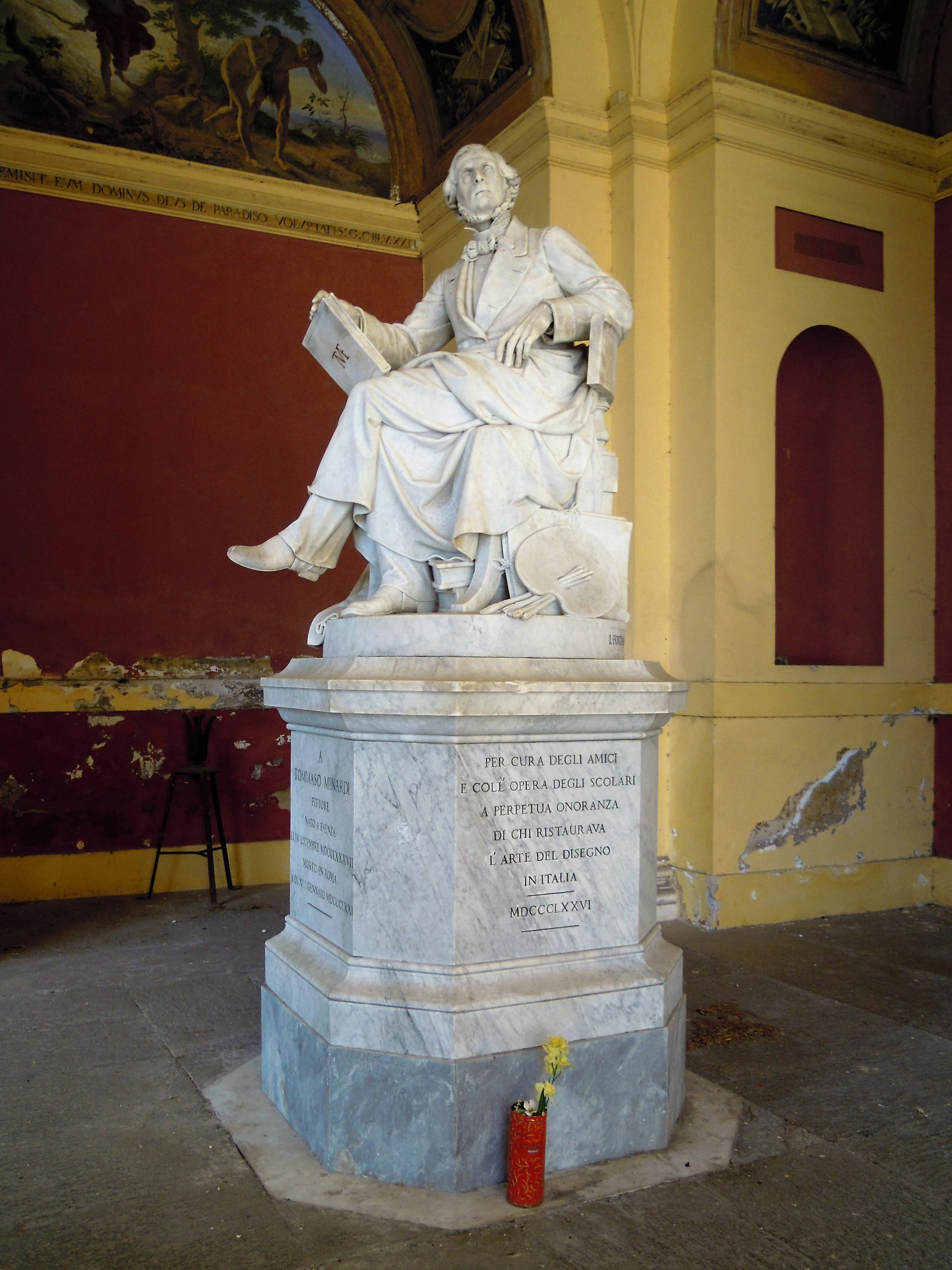
Rome: monument to Minardi in Campo Verano

Minardi was born in Faenza, Italy to father Carlo, a pharmacist and mother, Rosa Stanghellini of Marradi. He initially had some instruction in Faenza with Giuseppe Zauli. Zauli and a local erudite writer, Dionigi Strocchi, helped him obtain from 1803 to 1810 a scholarship from a religious fraternity of Faenza, called the Congregation of San Gregorio. Strocchi wrote him letters of introduction in Rome to Prince Chigi. In 1810, he won a competition and a stipend from the Accademia di Belle Arti di Bologna. In Rome, his detailed engravings of masterworks, such as one of Michelangelo's Last Judgement, brought him praise. He briefly spent time with the engraver Longhi in Milan, then returned to Rome. There he briefly joined the studio of Vincenzo Camuccini, a premier Neoclassic artist in Rome. Minardi became one of the leaders of a movement known as Purismo, who assembled in Rome between about 1810 and 1815.

In 1819 he moved to Perugia, to join the Accademia di Belle Arti de Perugia as the professor of drawing and was soon promoted to director. A post to which he was recommended by Antonio Canova. His skill as a draughtsman gained him the appointment in 1822 as professor of drawing at the Accademia di San Luca in Rome, replacing the recently deceased Luigi Agricola. He was to remain in Rome for thirty years in this position. In Rome, he accumulated a number of honors, and was named knight and Commendatore of the Ordine Piano, and gran commendatore of the Corona d'Italia. He was named inspector of public pictures, and to a number of commissions relating to art, as well as other art societies, including the Virtuosi of the Pantheon. He was named honorary member of a number of Art Academies across Europe.

It is no surprise that his skill in drawing attracted him to the Nazarene movement and followers of Ingres, who resided in Rome from 1834 to 1841. Over time, Minardi increasingly turned to religious themes in his paintings. Minardi and colleagues, Friedrich Overbeck, Pietro Tenerani, and Antonio Bianchini published a treatise on art titled ‘’Del purismo nelle arti of 1843’’.

He painted an Apparition of the Virgin to St Stanislao Kostka (1824) for the chamber in which the Saint died; in the Jesuit Novitiate at Sant'Andrea al Quirinale. He also painted a Madonna del Rosario, 1840, now at the Galleria nazionale d'arte moderna in Rome. He also painted a remarkable portrait of himself as an asthenic artist in a squalid studio (1813, now in the Uffizi, Florence). He painted a mural depicting Propagation of Faith for the throne room of the Palazzo Quirinale. Minardi left behind a trove of drawings and designs.

His studio in Rome was located in Piazza Venezia in the Palazzo Doria Pamphili. Among his pupils or painters he influenced were Giovanni Boldini, Ferdinando Cicconi, Luigi Cochetti, Gaetano Palmaroli, Luigi Fontana, Cesare Mariani, Paolo Mei, Guglielmo de Sanctis, and Scipione Vannutelli. Minardi died in Rome in 1871.

== Selected paintings ==
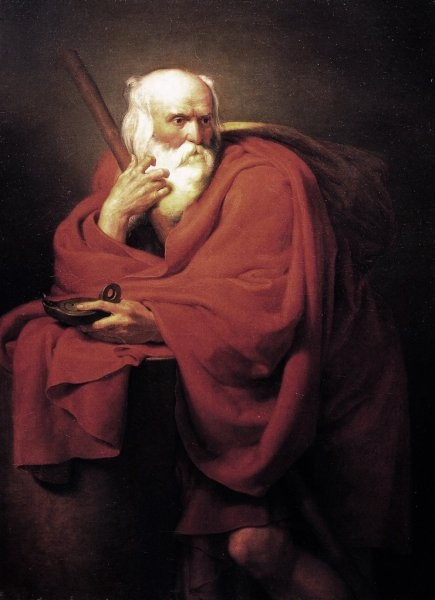
Diogenes

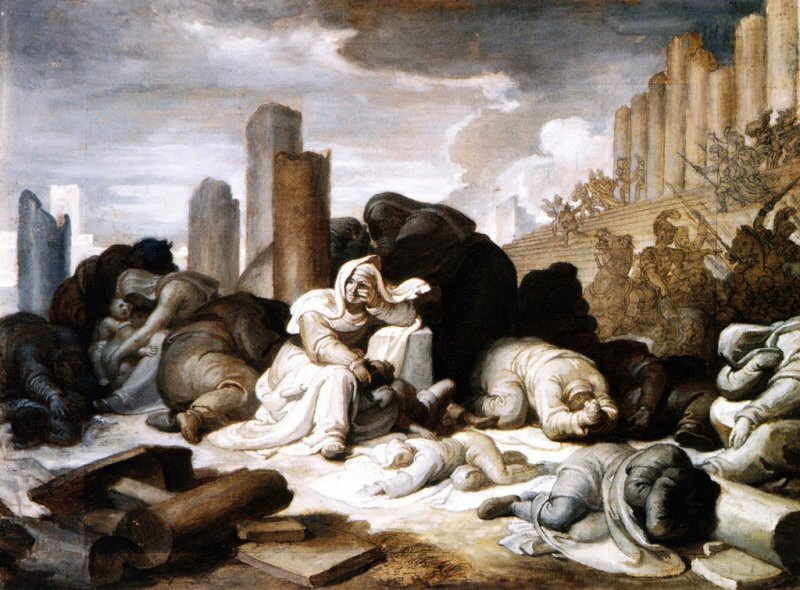
Destruction of the Temple

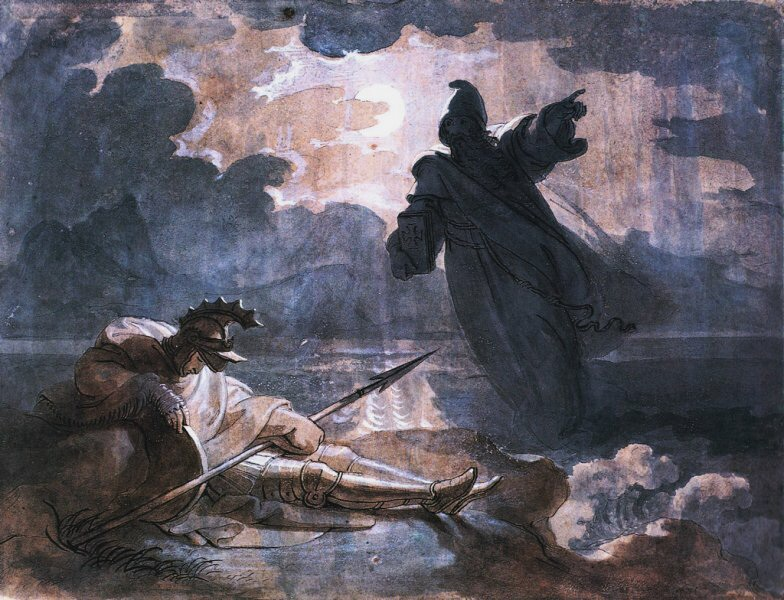
The Vision of Henry the Navigator

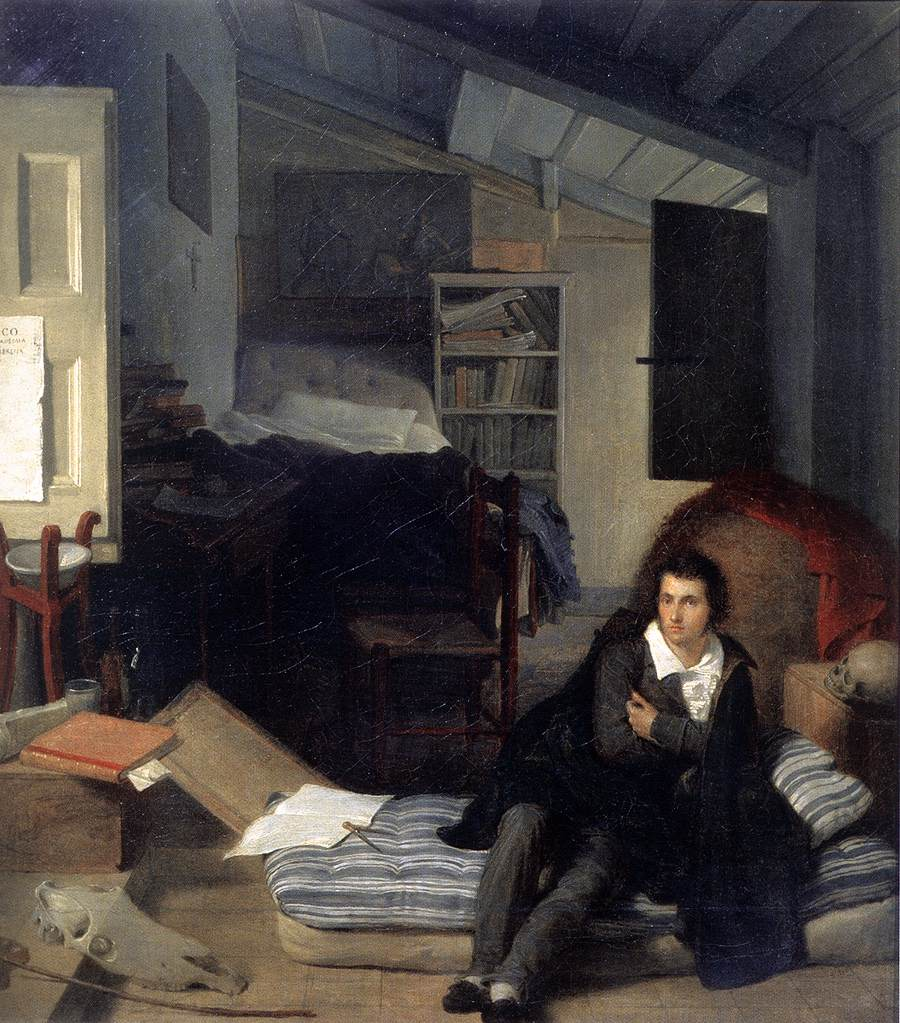
Self-portrait

== Sources ==
- Guglielmo De Sanctis, Tommaso Minardi e il suo tempo, Forzani E.C., Tipografi del Senato, Rome, 1899.
- Ernesto Ovidi, Tommaso Minardi e la sua scuola, Rome 1902.
- Conte Giovanni Battista Rossi-Scotti, Il professor Tommaso Minardi e l'Accademia di belle arti di Perugia: ricordi storici con nota delle opere dell' illustre Professore. (1874), Tipografia de Vincenzo Bartelli, Perugia.
