= Giuseppe Zauli =

Italian painter

Giuseppe Zauli (1763–1822) was an Italian painter and printmaker.

He trained at the Accademia Clementina of Bologna. He was a collaborator with Francesco Rosaspina and Felice Giani. He dedicated himself to the practice and teaching of engraving. He was the first director of a school of fine arts in Faenza, called "Scuola di Disegno e Plastica", begun in 1796. This would become the Scuola di Disegno Tommaso Minardi.

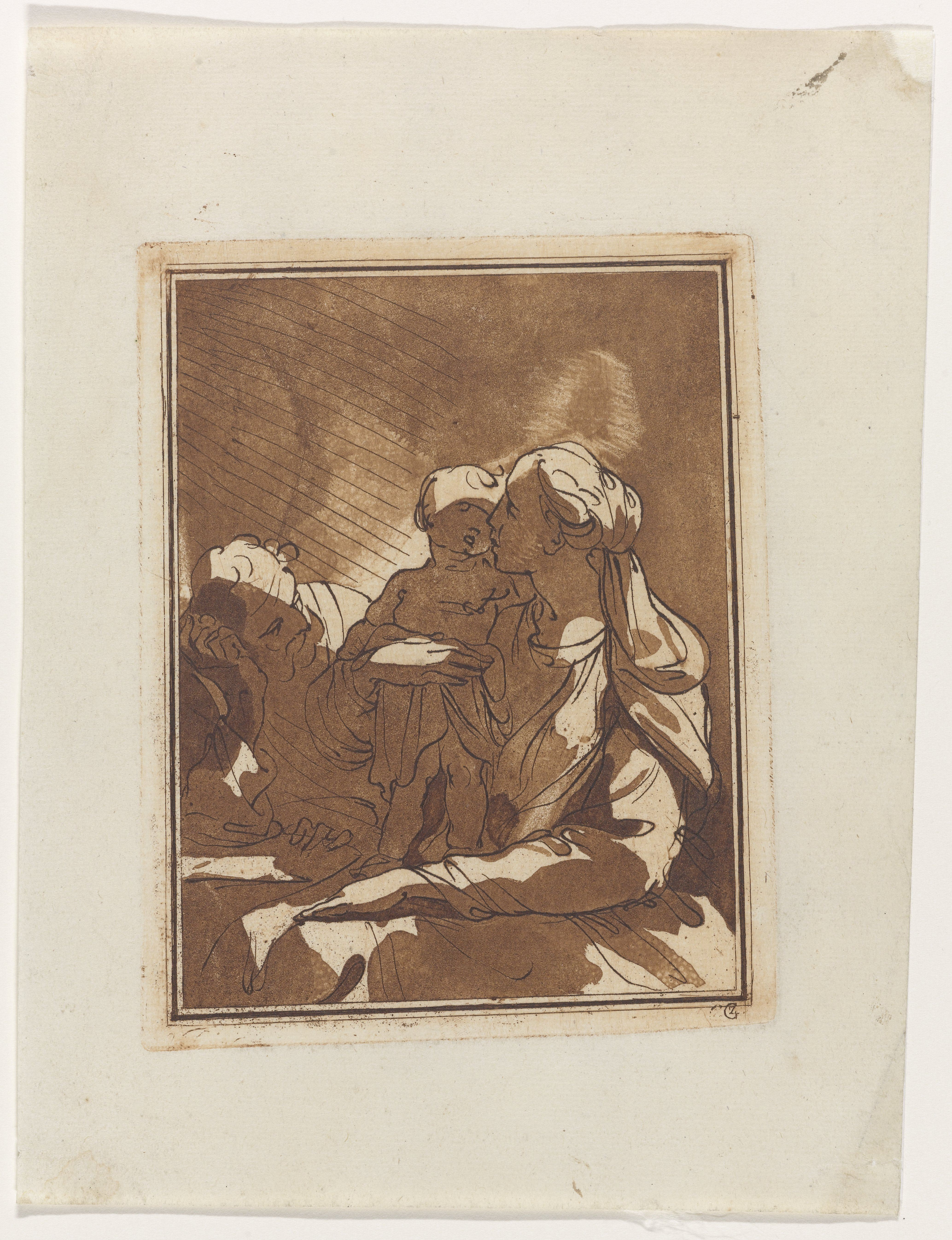
Holy Family, etching with aquatint, by Giuseppe Zauli
