= Zanobi =

Zanobi is a masculine Italian given name.

== Origins ==
From the name Greek Zenobios, derived from Zeus (the God Zeus) and bios (life), the name can be translated as he who takes life from Zeus.

The name is an evolution of Zenobio, which seems to have disappeared in Italy.

The name Zanobi is still very popular in Tuscany, in particular in Florence, because of Saint Zenobius of Florence (Italian: San Zanobi), who is venerated as the first Bishop of Florence. His feast day is celebrated on May 25.

== People ==
- San Zanobi (Saint Zenobius of Florence) (337–417), first bishop of Florence.
- Zanobi da Strada (1300), a writer, translator and correspondent of Petrarch.
- Zanobi Strozzi (1400), an assistant and pupil of Fra Angelico.
- Zanobi Machiavelli (1418–1479), a painter and illuminator.
- Zanobi Acciaiuoli (1461–1519), a Dominican friar, writer and translator.
- Zanobi Buondelmonti (fl. 1500), an important Florentine political figure quoted by Niccolò Machiavelli, and to whom Machiavelli dedicated his Discourses on Livy.
- Zanobi Poggino (1500), a portrait painter and pupil of Giovanni Antonio Sogliani.
- Zanobi del Rosso (1700), an architect and pupil of Giovanni Filippo Ciocchi.

== Variations ==
- Masculine: Zenobi, Zenobio
- Feminine: Zenobia
