= Zenobia (given name) =

Female given name

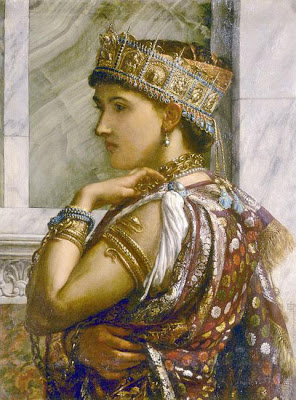
- Zenobia Captive by Sir Edward Poynter, 1878.
- Gender: Feminine
- Language: Greek

Origin
- Meaning: “Life of Zeus”
- Region of origin: Greece

Other names
- Related names: Zeena, Zenóbia (Hungarian), Zénobie (French), Zenobios, Zenovia, Zinovia (Greek), Zina, Zinoviy, Zinoviya (Russian), (Ukrainian)

Zenobia is a feminine given name of Greek origin meaning “life of Zeus”. It is the feminine form of Zenobios. The most famous bearer was Zenobia, queen of Palmyra.

Russian language form: Zinovia.

== Women ==
- Zenobia (c. 240–272) was Queen of the Palmyrene Empire.
- Zenobia of Armenia (1st century CE), Queen of Armenia
- Zenobios and Zenobia (d. c. 290), martyrs
- Zenobia Camprubí (1887–1956), Spanish-born writer and poet
- Zenobia Frost, Australian poet
- Zenobia Galar (born 1958), Dominican painter
- Zenobia Gilpin (c. 1898–1948), American physician and clubwoman
- Zenobia Jacobs, South African-born Australian archaeologist and earth scientist specialising in geochronology
- Zenobia Kloppers (born 1974), Namibian actress and writer
- Zenobia Revertera (1712–1779), Italian noble and courtier
- Zenobia Shroff (born 1965), Indian-born American actress

== Middle name ==
- L. Zenobia Coleman (1898–1999), American librarian
- Nannie Zenobia Carver Huddle (1860–1951), American painter

== See also ==
- Zenobia Żaczek (born 1974, formerly Jakub Żaczek, née Gawlikowski), Polish activist for the rights of tenants

== Fictional characters ==
- Zenobia (Conan), in the Conan the Barbarian mythos
- Zenobia, a character in Ethan Frome
- Zenobia, a character in Blithedale Romance
- Zenobia, a character in Blood and Gold
- Zenobia, a villain in Sinbad and the Eye of the Tiger
- Zenobia, a character in Italian Disney comics
- Zenobia, a Rare Blade in Xenoblade Chronicles 2
- Zenobia Dawson, a character in The Wire season 4
- Zenobia "Nobby" Hopwood, a character in several Jeeves novels and short stories by P. G. Wodehouse
