= Huddle (disambiguation) =

A huddle is an action of a sports team gathering together to talk to one another.

Huddle may also refer to:

- Huddle (surname) (including a list of persons with the name)
- Huddle (software), for collaboration and content management
- Huddle (film), a 1932 American movie
- Huddle (website), a Canadian business news website
- Huddles, a live group communication tool included in Slack (software)
- Huddles (app), a former short video sharing platform
- Huddling, a form of kleptothermy (thermoregulation in biology)

== See also ==
- Hudl, a software product and service to review game footage
- Tesco Hudl, a tablet computer
