= Zenobios =

Zenobios (Greek: Ζηνόβιος) is a Greek masculine given name. Feminine form: Zenobia. Zenobius in Latin, Zanobi in Italian, Zinobi/Zinobiy (Зенобий) in Bulgarian, Zinovi/Zinoviy in Russian (as well as the surname Zinovyev), and Zenob in Armenian, derive from it.

The name may refer to:

- Zenobius (fl. 86 BC), Pontic general in the First Mithridatic War
- Zenobius, (fl. AD 117–138) Greek sophist
- Zenobius (grammarian), Greek grammarian of an unknown era
- Zenobius, Greek 4nd-century rhetorician, teacher of Libanius
- Saint Zenobius of Florence (337–417)
- Hieromartyrs Zenobios and Zenobia
- Zenobius Acciaolus or Zanobi Acciaioli (1461–1519), Italian Dominican friar
- Zenobius Membre (1645 – c.1687), French Franciscan Recollect friar and missionary in North America
- Zinovios Valvis (1800–1886), Prime Minister of Greece
