= Zenobia (disambiguation) =

Zenobia (c. 240–272) was Queen of the Palmyrene Empire.

Zenobia may also refer to:

== People ==
- Zenobia (given name), the history and use of the name and a list of people and fictional characters with the given name

== Culture ==
- de:Zenobia (Metastasio), libretto by Metastasio set first by Bononcini 1737, then by 24 other composers, including:
  - Zenobia (Hasse), one of several operas.
  - Zenobia in Palmira, by Leonardo Leo (1694–1744)
  - Zenobia, by Luca Antonio Predieri (1688–1767)
  - Zenobia, by Louis Adolphe Coerne (1870–1922)
- Zenobia (play), a 1768 play by Arthur Murphy
- Zenobia, an 1837 novel by William Ware
- Zenobia's Suitors, a 1905 novel, sequel novel to "Sweet Love's Atonement" also posthumously published in 1905, by Emma Dorothy Eliza Nevitte (E.D.E.N.) Southworth.
  - Zenobia De Leon, Spanish orphan in the preceding novels, by Emma Southworth.'
- Zenobia (ballet), a ballet by George Balanchine for Richard Rodgers's 1936 musical On Your Toes
- Zenobia (film), a 1939 American comedy film directed by Gordon Douglas

== Places ==
- Halabiye or Zenobia, now an archaeological site, Syria
- Zenobia, Illinois, an unincorporated community, United States
- 840 Zenobia, an asteroid

== Ships ==
- Zenobia (ship)

== Other uses ==
- Zenobia (bird), a specific notable bird living in Syria
- Zenobia (plant), a North American genus of shrubs
  - Zenobia pulverulenta, the only known extant species in said genus.
- Zenobia swallowtail (Papilio zenobia), an African butterfly

== People with the middle name ==
- L. Zenobia Coleman (1898-1999), American librarian

== People with the given name ==
- Zenobia Camprubí (1887–1956), Spanish-born writer, poet and translator
- Zenobia Galar (born 1958), Dominican painter
- Zenobia Gilpin (c1898–1948), American physician and clubwoman
- Zenobia Kloppers (born 1974), Namibian actress
- Zenobia Powell Perry (1908–2004), American composer
- Zenobia Shroff (born 1965), Indian-American actress

== See also ==
- Zenobios (disambiguation)
