= Sigismondo Foschi =

Italian painter

Sigismondo Foschi, also called Sigismondo da Faenza (active 1520–1532) was an Italian painter of the Renaissance period, born and active in Faenza. He was likely a pupil of Giovanni Antonio Sogliani.

As a young man in 1520, he assisted his father in completing an altarpiece in a chapel in San Francesco in Faenza (now lost). Sigismondo's father, Antonio, was a gold and silversmith. Sigismondo painted an Assumption of the Virgin (1522) for the church of Santa Maria della Terra at Solarolo. He painted a Madonna and child with saints (1527) for the church of San Bartolomeo in Faenza. Other sundry works are assigned to the painter without definitive attribution. An altarpiece of Madonna and child with Saints Paul, John the Baptist, Benedict (?), Sebastian, Catherine and Apollonia, originally from the church of Santa Maria ad Nives, is found in the Pinacoteca of Faenza.

Documents establish that he had died by 1536.
