= Huddle (surname) =

Huddle is a surname. Notable people with the surname include:

- David Huddle (born 1942), American writer
- Franklin Huddle (born 1943), American diplomat who served as a consul and an ambassador
- J. Klahr Huddle (1891–1959), United States Ambassador to Burma
- Molly Huddle (born 1984), American distance runner
- Nannie Zenobia Carver Huddle (1860–1951), American painter
- Rebeca Huddle (born 1973 or 1974), American judge
- William Henry Huddle (1847–1892), American painter
