= Tesco Hudl 2 =

Tablet computer

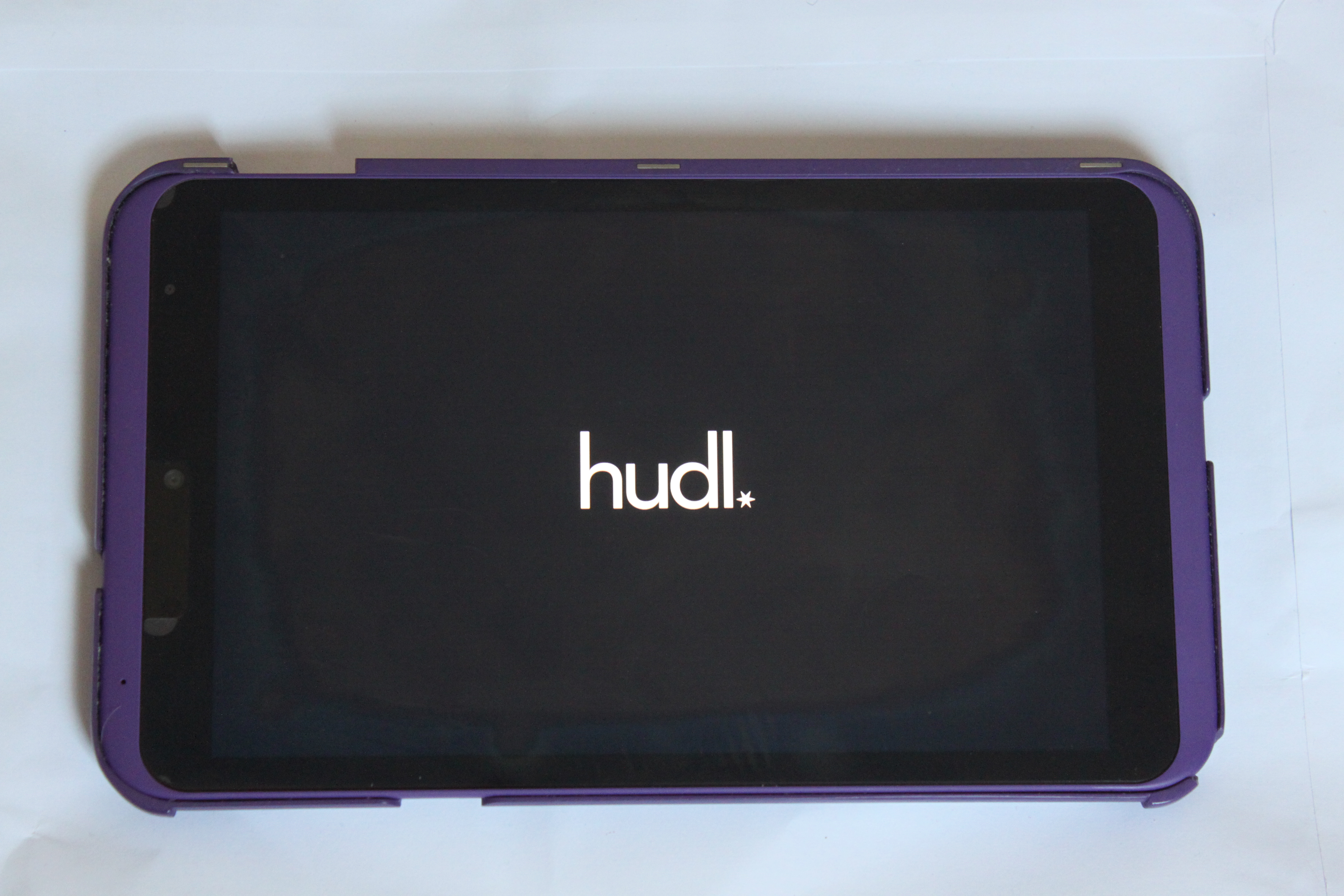
- Developer: Tesco
- Manufacturer: Pegatron Corporation
- Type: Tablet computer
- Released: 9 October 2014
- Introductory price: £129
- Discontinued: October 22, 2015
- Operating system: Android 4.4 KitKat; Upgradable to 5.1 Lollipop
- System on a chip: Intel Atom Quad Core Z3735D
- CPU: 1.83 GHz
- Memory: 2 GB RAM
- Storage: 16 GB
- Removable storage: microSDXC up to 128 GB
- Display: IPS 8.3-inch (21 cm) LCD; 1920 × 1200 px (273 ppi)
- Camera: Rear: 1080p HD video; 5 MP, autofocus Front: 1.2 MP, fixed-focus
- Connectivity: Wi-Fi (802.11 a/b/g/n); Bluetooth 4.0; Micro-USB; Micro-HDMI
- Power: 5.7 Ah battery
- Dimensions: 128 mm (5.0 in) H 224 mm (8.8 in) W 9 mm (0.35 in) D
- Weight: 410.4 grams (14.48 oz)
- Predecessor: Tesco Hudl
- Successor: N/A
- Website: Official website

The Hudl 2 was a tablet computer that was produced for British retailer Tesco and manufactured by Pegatron. It was announced in October 2014 as the successor to the 2013 Tesco Hudl. The device featured an 8.3-inch screen, a 1.83 GHz quad-core processor and 16 GB of internal flash memory. The tablet was launched with Android 4.4.2 KitKat and was officially upgradeable to Android 5.1 Lollipop.

== History ==
The Hudl 2 was announced at a launch event on 3 October 2014, with the tagline "We want to show you the bigger picture", accompanied by the hashtag "#Letshudl".

== Hardware ==
=== Design ===
The Hudl 2 was available in eight colours. It had a soft coating on its back and a large front bezel. When held in landscape, it was wider and slimmer than the original Hudl, but was the same height. At 420 grams it was heavier than its predecessor; the original Hudl weighed 370 g.

=== Screen and input ===
The Hudl 2 had an 8.3" IPS panel, LCD with a resolution of HD 1920 × 1200 and a pixel density of 273 ppi. A micro-HDMI port allowed connection of an external display.

=== Audio and output ===
The Hudl 2 had speakers on the back of the device, with speaker holes in two rows at each side of the tablet. There was also a standard 3.5 mm headphone jack.

=== Battery ===
Tesco claimed that the battery could last up to 8 hours (depending on use), an hour more than the original Hudl.

=== Storage ===
The Hudl 2 came with 16 GB of internal storage, of which approximately 9 GB was available to the user. The total storage capacity of the Hudl 2 was expandable through the microSD card slot up to 32 GB. With the 5.1 Lollipop update, the Hudl 2 officially supported 128 GB cards (formatted FAT32).

== Accessories ==
There was a range of accessories available for the Hudl 2. Tesco offered:

- Cases
- Styli
- Children’s headphones
- Earbud headphones
- Screen protectors
- Car charging kits

== Software and applications ==
The tablet ran on Google’s Android operating system, providing features such as voice search. It had access to Google’s collection of apps including Chrome and Google Maps. It also had some of the same software as the first Hudl such as BlinkBox, allowing the user to purchase or rent films. The Hudl 2 came with new e-reader software for viewing e-books. As it was Tesco's product, there was an emphasis on encouraging the users to continue or start shopping in Tesco by having services such as Tesco Direct and Tesco Bank in folders available from the home-screen. The 'My Tesco' launcher was present as it was for the first Hudl, allowing the users to perform actions such as access their Clubcard account or to find their nearest Tesco store.

=== Child use ===
Tesco marketed the Hudl 2 as a family tablet and included a dedicated child safety app to achieve this goal. The app allowed users to create separate accounts for each user and limited accessible web content based on the user’s age range. Other features of the child safety app included the ability to control the amount of time users were allowed to use the device each day and the ability to block entire apps from users.

== Reception ==
Reviewers were impressed by the specifications of the tablet for its price point: Chris Finnamore of ExpertReviews rated it 5 out of 5, calling it a "vast improvement" over the Hudl 1. CNET wrote "it has more than enough to satisfy most families and its wealth of parental control information will help you arm your kids with the knowledge they need to stay safe online". The parental control options were lauded by other reviewers as well; AndroidCentral described how "owners are asked if they wish to configure the hudl2 to block sensitive content, restrict the amount of time a child can use the product, and more". A shared point of praise among reviews was that of the Hudl 2’s strong push towards family and less savvy customer usage. The Independent were particularly impressed with the Get Started app. They said "Get Started offers comprehensive and clear tips on how to use the tablet for everything from shopping to gaming, as well as showing some basic security measures and ways to share the Hudl safely among family members".

Despite the many successes of the Hudl 2, reviewers were displeased with some of the more fundamental specifications. The five megapixel camera was described as "shoddy" by The Independent, and many reviewers were unimpressed with the battery life. As with many tablets, the Hudl 2 came with several preinstalled apps of varying usefulness which cannot be removed but can be disabled. The "My Tesco" launcher is preinstalled as the default launcher, though has been described as "sluggish" by TechRadar.

== Discontinuation ==
On 23 October 2015, Tesco announced that it would no longer be stocking the Hudl 2 although it would continue offering technical support to existing owners. While it did not explain the reason behind the decision, the company had been pursuing a strategy to focus on its core bricks-and-mortar grocery business which had already seen it sell off or close its video streaming and e-book operations. The announcement came one week after Tesco had announced that it had no plans for a Hudl 3 and "nothing planned at the moment" in the sector. According to Marketing Magazine, a number of key people who had worked on the Hudl project, including its lead Android engineer and product managers, were no longer with Tesco.

On the 26 June 2020 one of Tesco's main support server SSL certificates expired and Tesco did not renew it. This meant that whilst the server was still available, technical workarounds were required in order to access it. This did not affect the day-to-day use of the Hudl 2, but caused massive problems when a factory reset was performed. During part of the start up process, the tablet attempts to access this server, but the attempt is always unsuccessful (because of the invalid SSL certificate). This effectively blocks the start up process and completely bricks the device. The error is displayed as a WiFi problem. As stated, there are workarounds that can fix the problem (by changing the system date on the tablet), but they will only work for as long as the Tesco server remains operational – a Tesco server switch off is an inevitability with an unknown timeframe. For this reason it is strongly recommended that users do not factory reset Hudl devices. As of early 2023, changing the system date is believed to no longer work.
