= Zinovy =

Zinovy or Zinovi (Russian: Зиновий, romanized: Zinoviy; Ukrainian: Зиновій, romanized: Zynoviy) is an East Slavic male given name derived from Zenobios. Feminine forms: Russian: Zinovia, Ukrainian: Zynoviia (cf. Zenobia).

Notable people with the name include:

- Zinovy Feldman (1893–1942), Russian Jewish composer
- Zinovy Levovich Feldman (ru) (1919–1989), Soviet film director
- Zinovy Gerdt (1916–1996), Soviet/Russian theatre and cinema actor, recognized with the title People's Artist of the USSR
- Zynoviy Bohdan Mykhailovych Khmelnitsky or Bohdan Khmelnytsky (1595–1657), hetman of the Zaporozhian Cossack Host
- Zynoviy Kovalyk
- Zinovy Peshkov (1884–1966), Russian-born French general and diplomat
- Zinovy Reichstein, Russian-born American mathematician
- Zinovy Roizman (1941–2022), Russian film and animation director and screenwriter
- Zinovy Rozhestvensky (1848–1909), admiral of the Imperial Russian Navy
- Zinovy Serdyuk (1903–1982), Moldavian politician
- Zinovii Shulman (1924–2007) Belarusian hydrodynamics engineer
- Zinovy Vilensky (1899–1984), Russian sculptor who worked and lived in Moscow
- Zinovy Vysokovsky (1932–2009), Soviet and Russian theater and movie actor and variety performer
- Zinovy Zinik (born 1945), novelist and broadcaster
