= Annals (Tacitus) =

History of the Roman Empire by the Roman historian and senator Publius Cornelius Tacitus

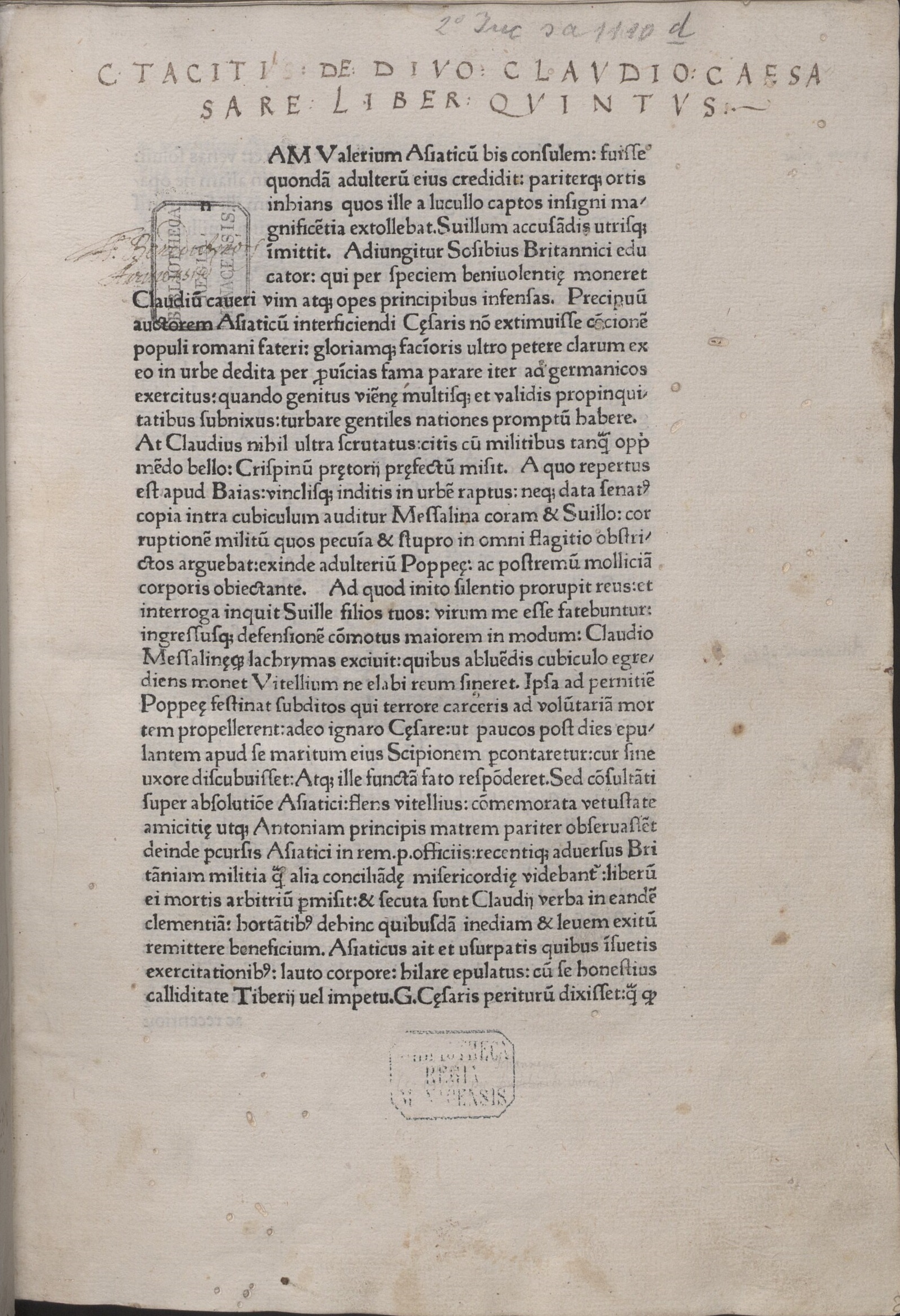
- First page of books XI–XVI of Tacitus' Annals (Venice: Vindelinus de Spira, ca. 1471/72)
- Author: Tacitus
- Original title: Ab Excessu divi Augusti Historiarum Libri
- Language: Latin
- Genre: History
- Publication date: c. AD 105–116
- Publication place: Roman Empire
- Media type: Manuscript
- Dewey Decimal: 937.07
- LC Class: DG207.T3 G68
- Original text: Ab Excessu divi Augusti Historiarum Libri at Latin Wikisource
- Translation: Annals at Wikisource

The Annals (Latin: Annales) by Roman historian and senator Tacitus is a history of the Roman Empire from the reign of Tiberius to that of Nero, the years AD 14–68. The Annals are an important source for modern understanding of the history of the Roman Empire during the 1st century AD. Tacitus' final work is generally considered by modern historians his magnum opus which historian Ronald Mellor says represents the "pinnacle of Roman historical writing".

Tacitus' Histories and Annals together amounted to 30 books, although some scholars disagree about which work to assign some books to; traditionally 14 are assigned to Histories and 16 to Annals. Of the 30 books referred to by Jerome about half have survived.

Modern scholars believe that, as a Roman senator, Tacitus had access to Acta Senatus—the Roman senate's records—which provided a solid basis for his work. Although Tacitus refers to part of his work as "my annals", the title of the work Annals used today was not assigned by Tacitus himself, but derives from its year-by-year structure. The name of the current manuscript seems to be "Books of History from the Death of the Divine Augustus" (Ab Excessu divi Augusti Historiarum Libri).

== Background and structure ==
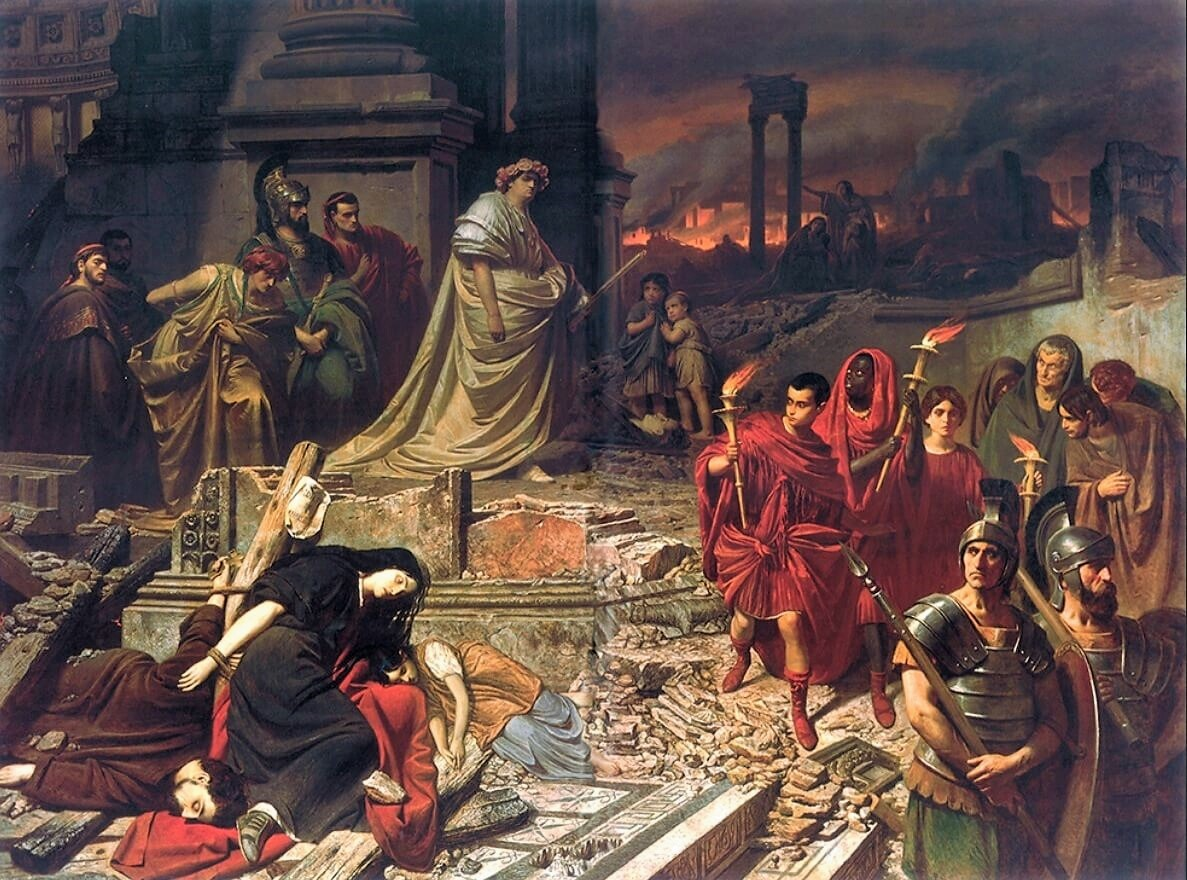
The Fire of Rome, July 64, during the reign of Nero, by Karl von Piloty, 1861.

The Annals was Tacitus' final work and provides a key source for modern understanding of the history of the Roman Empire from the beginning of the reign of Tiberius in AD 14 to the end of the reign of Nero, in AD 68. Tacitus wrote the Annals in at least 16 books, but books 7–10 and parts of books 5, 6, 11 and 16 are missing.

The period covered by the Histories (written before the Annals) starts at the beginning of the year AD 69, i.e. six months after the death of Nero and continues to the death of Domitian in 96. It is not known when Tacitus began writing the Annals, but he was well into writing it by AD 116. Modern scholars believe that as a senator, Tacitus had access to Acta Senatus, the Roman senate's records, thus providing a solid basis for his work.

Together the Histories and the Annals amounted to 30 books. These thirty books are referred to by Saint Jerome, and about half of them have survived. Although some scholars differ on how to assign the books to each work, traditionally fourteen are assigned to Histories and sixteen to the Annals. Tacitus' friend Pliny referred to "your histories" when writing to him about his earlier work. Although Tacitus refers to part of his work as "my annals", the title of the work Annals used today was not assigned by Tacitus himself, but derives from its year-by-year structure.

Of the sixteen books in Annals, the reign of Tiberius takes up six books, of which only Book 5 is missing. These books are neatly divided into two sets of three, corresponding to the change in the nature of the political climate during the period.

The next six books are devoted to the reigns of Caligula and Claudius. Books 7 through 10 are missing. Books 11 and 12 cover the period from the treachery of Messalina to the end of Claudius' reign.

The final four books cover the reign of Nero and Book 16 cuts off in the middle of the year AD 66. This leaves the material that would have covered the final two years of Nero's reign lost.

== Content and style ==
Tacitus documented a Roman imperial system of government. He chose to start his work with the death of Augustus Caesar in AD 14, and his succession by Tiberius.

As in the Histories, Tacitus maintains his thesis of the necessity of the Principate. He says again that Augustus gave and warranted peace to the state after years of civil war, but on the other hand he shows us the dark side of life under the Caesars. The history of the beginning of the principate is also the history of the end of the political freedom that the senatorial aristocracy, which Tacitus viewed as morally decadent, corrupt, and servile towards the emperor, had enjoyed during the republic. During Nero's reign there had been a widespread diffusion of literary works in favor of this suicidal exitus illustrium virorum ("end of the illustrious men"). Again, as in his Agricola, Tacitus is opposed to those who chose useless martyrdom through vain suicides.

In the Annals, Tacitus further improved the style of portraiture that he had used so well in the Historiae. Perhaps the best portrait is that of Tiberius, portrayed in an indirect way, painted progressively during the course of a narrative, with observations and commentary along the way filling in details. Tacitus portrays both Tiberius and Nero as tyrants who caused fear in their subjects. But while he views Tiberius as someone who had once been a great man, Tacitus considers Nero as simply despicable.

Books
Books	Subjects
1	AD 14–15: Death and funeral of Augustus; accession of Tiberius. Drusus and the mutiny of the Pannonian legions. Germanicus and the mutiny of the German legions.
2	AD 16–19: War in Germania continued. Libo Drusus, Piso, and Asinius Gallus oppose Tiberius. Tacfarinas's revolt. Germanicus is posted to Asia Minor, followed by his death.
3	AD 20–22: Germanicus' funeral. Domestic politics and legal matters of Rome. Beginning of the Gallic Wars. Tacfarinas's revolt continued.
4	AD 23–28: Rise of Sejanus who poisons Drusus. Tacfarinas' revolt ends. War in Thrace. Agrippina makes moves. Tiberius abandons the capital, first for Campania, later to Capri. Fire on the Coelian Hill in Rome. Condemnation of Titius Sabinus.
5	AD 29: Death of Empress Livia (book incomplete). [AD 31: Fall of Sejanus.]
6	AD 32–37: Purges after the fall of Sejanus. Parthian War. Fire on the Aventine Hill in Rome. Death of Tiberius.
11	AD 47–48: Reign of Claudius (since 41; earlier years missing). Prosecutions of Suillius. Turmoil in Armenia. Corbulo settles a Frisian revolt. Senatorial rights extended to the provinces. Execution of Messalina.
12	AD 49–54: Claudius remarries, and adopts Nero. Adjustments with Parthia. The pomerium enlarged. Invasion of Britain continues with a campaign against Caratacus. Disorders in Armenia. Draining of Fucine Lake. Death of Claudius.
13	AD 54–59: Nero becomes emperor; the murder of Britannicus. Continued trouble with Parthia over Armenia. Rome meets disaster in Armenia, saved by Corbulo. Wars with and among Germans continue.
14	AD 59–62: Nero murders his mother Agrippina. Neronia founded. Corbulo betters the course of Rome in Armenia. In Britain, the Icenian revolt under Boudicca. Criminal trials and political purges in Rome. Murder of Rubellius Plautus and Octavia.
15	AD 62–65: Roman defeat in Armenia, although "spun" as a victory; followed, however, by a further adjustment with Parthia in which the Armenian king Tiridates travels to Rome to become a nominal vassal of Rome. The Great Fire of Rome. Pisonian conspiracy fails. Forced suicides of Seneca and Lucan.
16	AD 65–66: Continued persecution of the nobility; death of Petronius. A group of Stoic philosophers plots against Nero. The conspirators Thrasea Paetus and Barea Soranus are murdered. The last two years of Nero's reign are missing.

== Provenance and authenticity ==
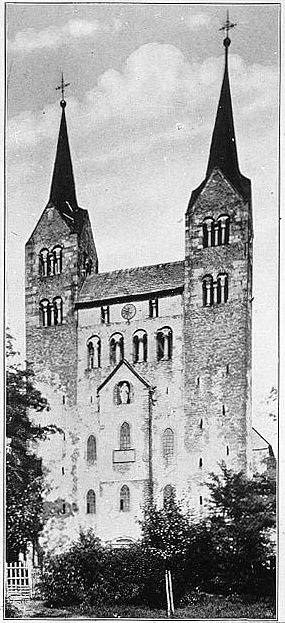
Corvey Abbey in Germany, where Annals 1–6 were discovered.

Since the 18th century, at least five attempts have been made to challenge the authenticity of the Annals as having been written by someone other than Tacitus, Voltaire's criticism being perhaps the first. Voltaire was generally critical of Tacitus and said that Tacitus did not comply with the standards for providing a historical background to civilization. In 1878, John Wilson Ross and, in 1890, Polydore Hochart suggested that the whole of the Annals had been forged by the Italian scholar Poggio Bracciolini (1380–1459). According to Robert Van Voorst this was an "extreme hypothesis" which never gained a following among modern scholars. Voorst, however, does not address any of Ross' objections regarding numerous purported historical inaccuracies in the Annals, but only faults Hochart on a few points in a footnote.

The provenance of the manuscripts containing the Annals goes back to the Renaissance. While Bracciolini had discovered three minor works at Hersfeld Abbey in Germany in 1425, Zanobi da Strada (who died in 1361) had probably earlier discovered Annals 11–16 at Monte Cassino where he lived for some time. The copies of Annals at Monte Cassino were probably moved to Florence by Giovanni Boccaccio (1313–1375), a friend of da Strada, who is also credited with their discovery at Monte Cassino. Regardless of whether the Monte Cassino manuscripts were moved to Florence by Boccaccio or da Strada, Boccaccio made use of the Annals when he wrote Commento di Dante c. 1374 (before the birth of Poggio Bracciolini), giving an account of Seneca's death directly based on the Tacitean account in Annals book 15. Francis Newton states that it is likely that Annals 11–16 were in Monte Cassino during the first half of the rule of Abbot Desiderius (1058–1087) who later became Pope Victor III. Annals 1–6 were then independently discovered at Corvey Abbey in Germany in 1508 by Giovanni Angelo Arcimboldi, afterwards Archbishop of Milan, and were first published in Rome in 1515 by Beroaldus, by order of Pope Leo X, who afterwards deposited the manuscript in the Medicean Library in Florence.

== In popular culture ==
In Donna Leon's third Commissario Brunetti novel Dressed for Death (1994), the protagonist reads Tacitus' Annals in his spare time in the evenings, and various references to that material are made throughout the novel.

In Mikhail Bulgakov's The Master and Margarita Tacitus’ Annals is referenced, as the MASSOLIT editor Berlioz asserts that its mention of the crucifixion of Jesus Christ is a spurious interjection, added later, and not written by Tacitus.

In Jorge Luis Borges' short story The Garden of Forking Paths, when Yu Tsun, the main character, takes the train to carry out his final mission in the fictitious town of Ashgrove, among the few persons he encounters on the train is a young man fervently reading Tacitus’ Annals.

Tacitus is also mentioned briefly in The Mysteries of Udolpho by Ann Radcliffe, volume VI, chapter VIII.

== See also ==
- Tacitean studies
- Tacitus on Jesus
- Virius Nicomachus Flavianus, who wrote a lost historical work entitled Annals, probably a continuation of Tacitus' work.
