= Galar =

Galar may refer to:

- Fjalar and Galar, figures in Nordic mythology
- Galar Region, the setting for the game Pokémon Sword and Shield
- Galar, Spain, a town in Spain
- Pentre Galar, a small settlement in Wales
- Zenobia Galar, Dominican painter

== See also ==
- Golar (disambiguation)
