= Golar =

Golar may refer to:

- Esther Golar (1944–2015), American politician
- Charlotte Golar Richie (born 1958), American politician
- Golar LNG, gas shipping company
- Bahnar Golar, a subdivision of the Bahnar language
- Golar Productions, a former film production company

== See also ==
- Galar (disambiguation)
