= Surrender of Santa Anna =

1886 painting by William Henry Huddle

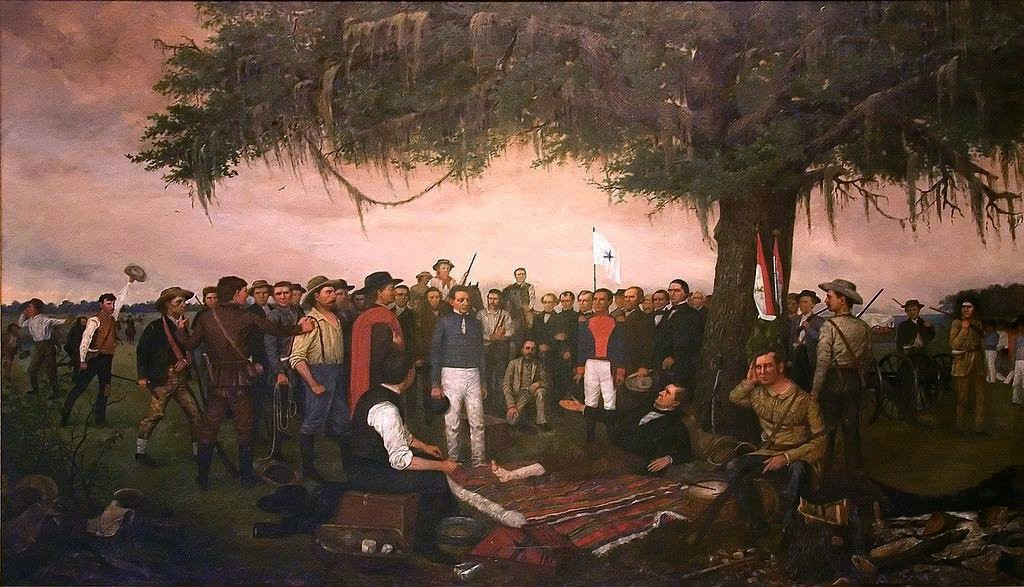
- Artist: William Henry Huddle
- Year: 1886
- Location: Austin, Texas, United States

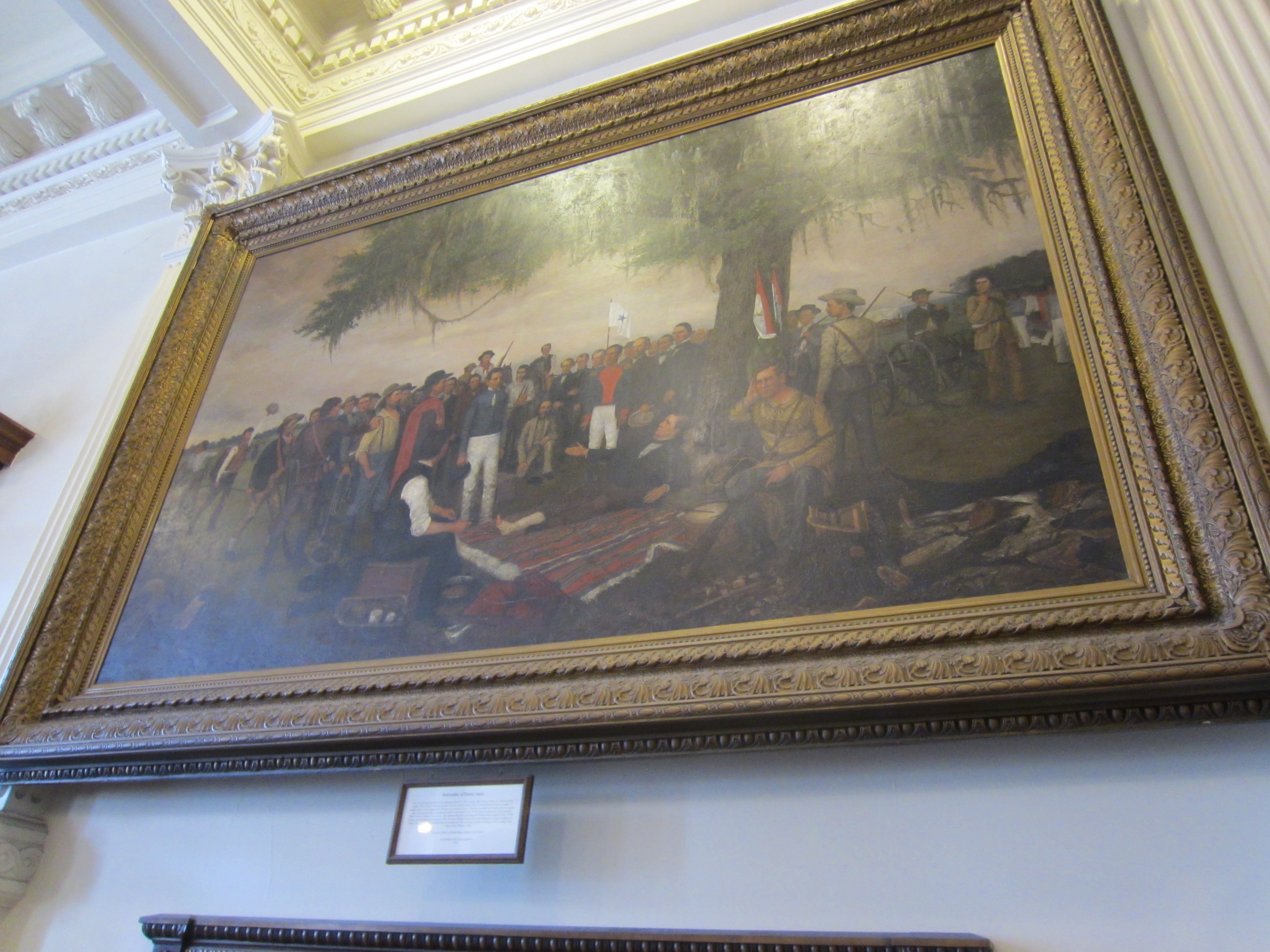
The painting in 2018

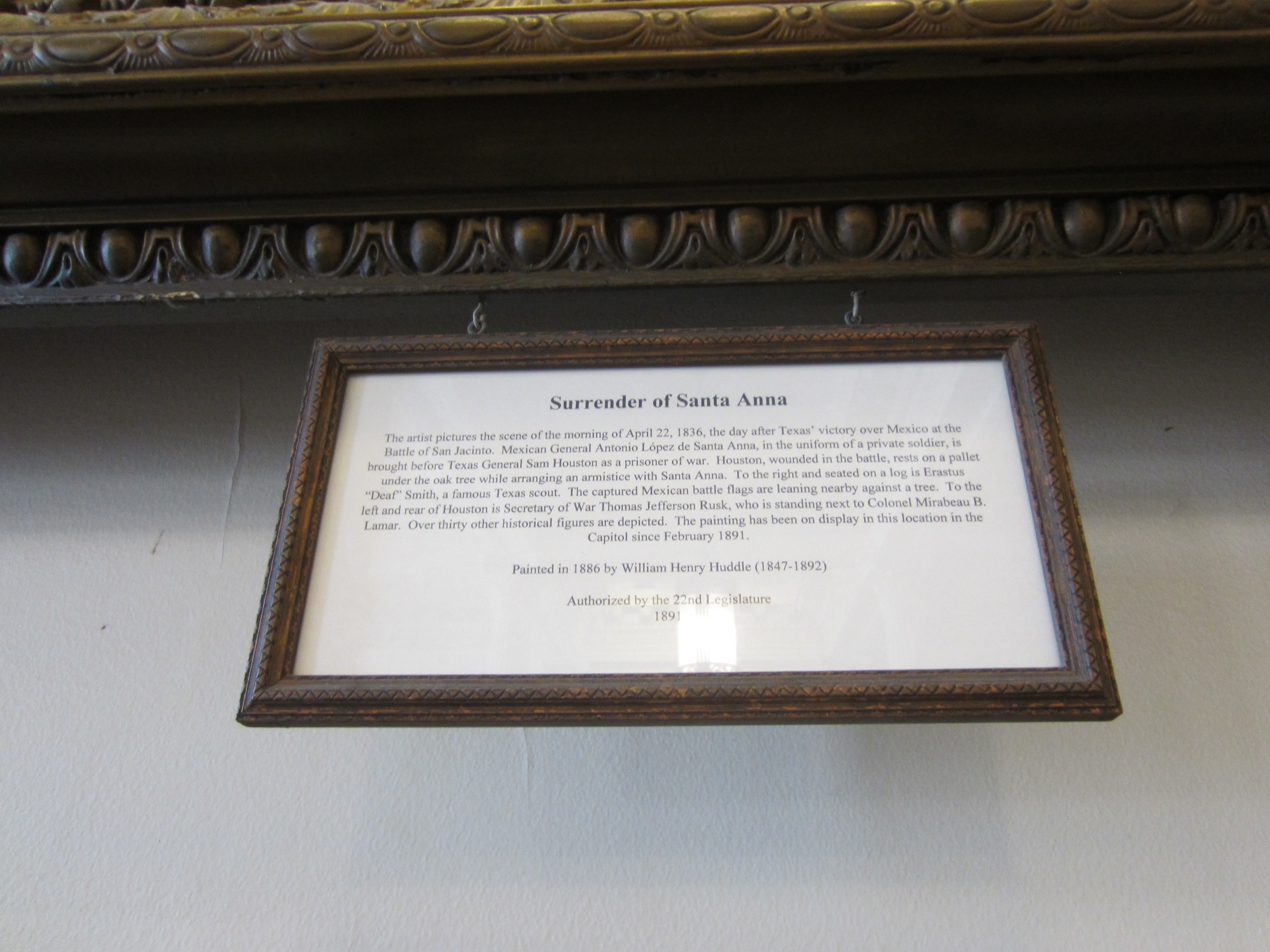
Sign for the painting, 2018

Surrender of Santa Anna is an 1886 painting by William Henry Huddle, displayed at the Texas State Capitol in Austin, Texas, United States. The painting depicts the end of the Texas Revolution with Mexico's surrender to the Texan militia. The Texan general, Sam Houston is seen wounded under a tree.

== See also ==
- 1886 in art
