= Zeena =

Zeena is a given name. Notable people with the name include:

- Zeena Parkins (born 1956), American harpist
- Zeena Schreck (born 1963), American artist and spiritual leader
- Zeena Zaki (born 1974), Iraqi haute couture fashion designer
- Zeena Khalaf (born 1977), Palestinian Pharmacist

Fictional characters:

- Zeena (nickname for Zenobia), a character in the 1911 novel Ethan Frome
- Zeena, one of the members of the Deadly Six in the video game Sonic Lost World

== See also ==
- Zenobia (disambiguation)
- Xena
- Xenia (disambiguation)
- Zena (disambiguation)
- Zenia (disambiguation)
