= Tesco Hudl =

Tablet computer

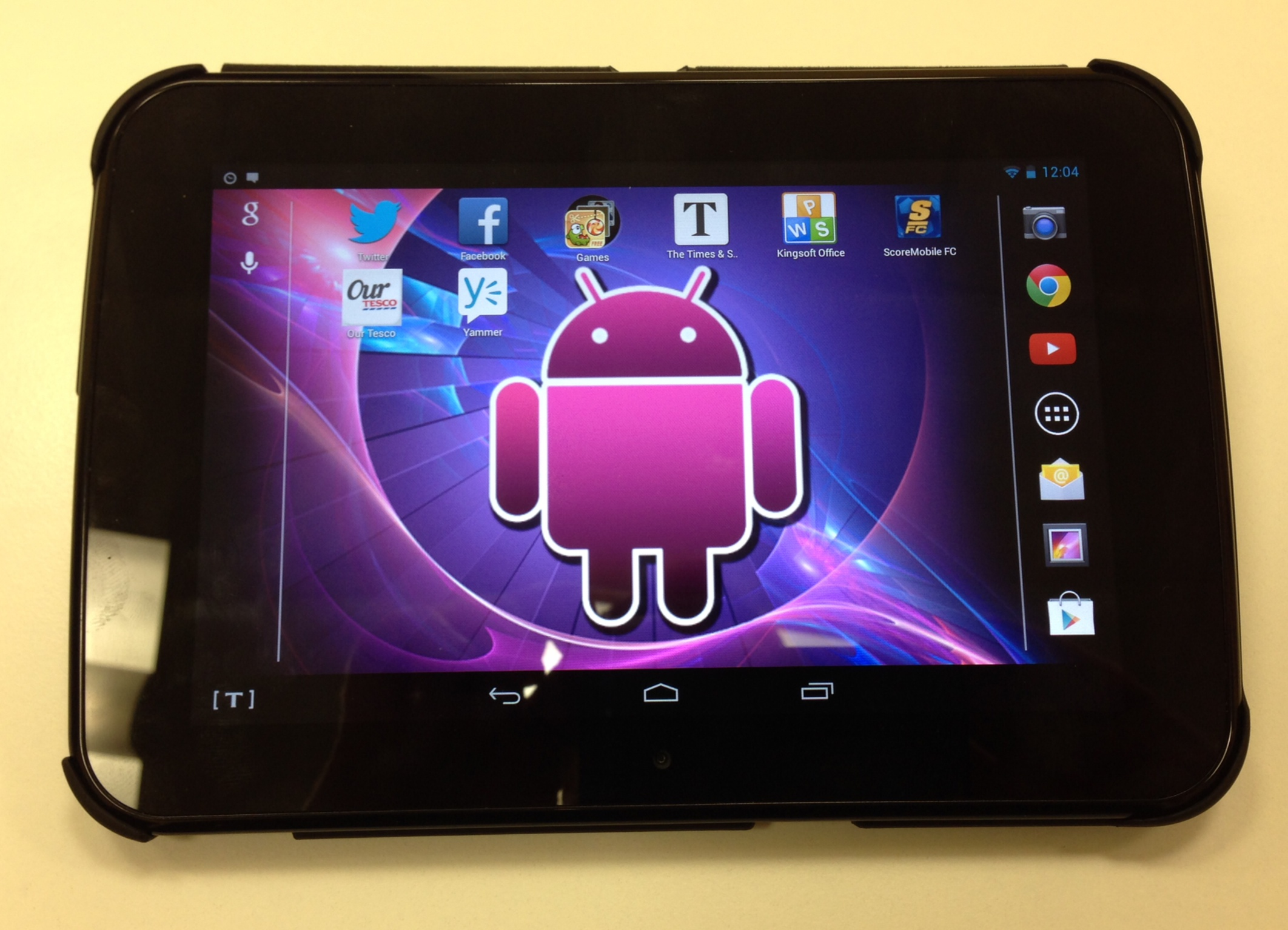
- Tesco Hudl with case attached
- Developer: Tesco
- Manufacturer: Wistron
- Type: Tablet computer
- Released: 30 September 2013
- Introductory price: £119.00
- Discontinued: October 22, 2015
- Units sold: 500,000
- Operating system: Android 4.2.2 "Jelly Bean"
- System on a chip: Quad-core Rockchip RK3188 w/ Mali 400 Graphics
- CPU: 1.5 GHz
- Memory: 1 GB RAM
- Storage: 16 GB flash memory
- Display: IPS 7-inch (18 cm) LCD; 1440 × 900 px (242 ppi; 95.3 ppcm) (WSXGA); 16:10 aspect ratio (1080p HDMI output)
- Camera: 720p HD video; 3 MP rear (autofocus); 2 MP front (fixed-focus)
- Connectivity: Wi-Fi (802.11 a/b/g/n); Bluetooth 4.0; Micro-USB; Micro-HDMI
- Dimensions: 192.8 mm (7.59 in) H 128.8 mm (5.07 in) W 9.85 mm (0.388 in) D
- Weight: 370 grams (0.82 lb)
- Successor: Tesco Hudl 2
- Website: tesco.com/hudl

The Tesco Hudl is a tablet computer launched by British retailer Tesco in 2013. The device featured a seven-inch screen, a 1.5 GHz quad-core processor and 16 GB of internal flash memory (expandable up to 64 GB). The Hudl ran the Android Jelly Bean operating system and was manufactured by Wistron.

In April 2014, it was announced that Tesco had sold 500,000 Hudl tablets since launch, and a new model was planned. The second generation Hudl 2 was announced in October 2014. However, in October 2015, the brand was discontinued.

== Rooting ==
The Tesco Hudl was mostly vanilla Android with only some vendor customisation, and therefore could be rooted. The root required users to flash an altered file which grants root permissions.

== Accessories ==
A range of accessories were available for the device, including a leather case, a soft-touch case, ear-bud headphones, children's headphones, a protective bumper case, a screen protection kit and recharging cables.

== Discontinuation and server shutdown ==
On 26 June 2020, one of Tesco's main support server SSL certificates expired and Tesco did not renew it. This meant that whilst the server was still available, technical workarounds were required in order to access it. This does not affect the day-to-day use of the Hudl tablet, but causes massive problems when a factory reset is performed. During part of the start up process, the tablet attempts to access this server, but the attempt is always unsuccessful (because of the invalid SSL certificate). This effectively blocks the start up process and completely bricks the device. The error is displayed as a WiFi problem.

There was a workaround that fixed the issue by changing the system date on the tablet but that only worked when the Tesco server remained operational. At some point in early 2023 this was shut down. As of now, the only way to get the tablet working is to use a custom ROM image which removes the Tesco apps and bypasses the above mentioned check.It is strongly recommended therefore, that users do not factory reset a working Hudl device if at all possible.
