= Santa Maria ad Nives, Faenza =

Roman Catholic church

Coordinates: 44.2849°N 11.8759°E

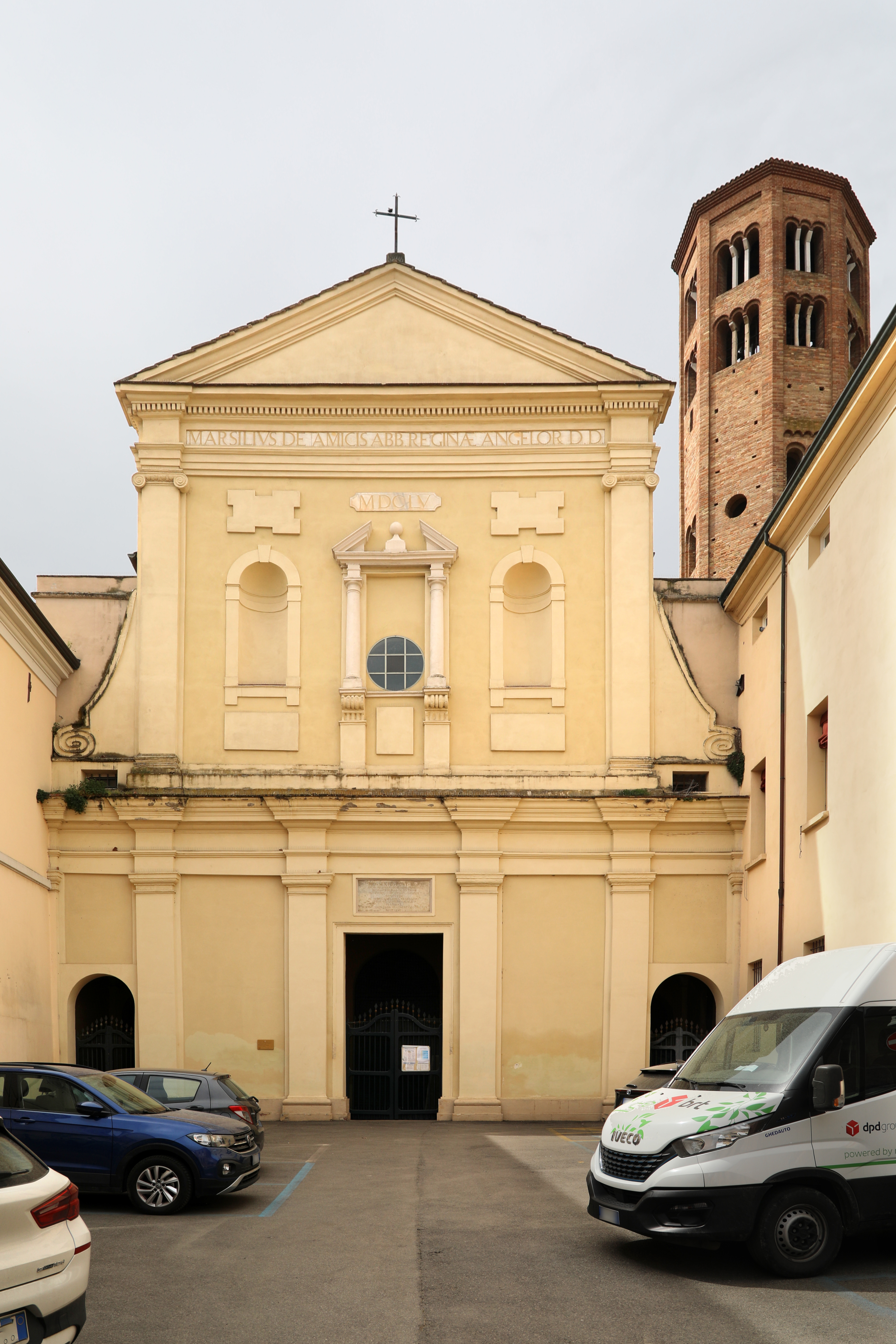
Facade and bell tower

Santa Maria ad Nives is a Roman Catholic church, located on Piazza Santa Maria Foris Portam, in Faenza, Italy.

== History and description ==
Originally located outside of the 14th-century city walls, likely in the 6th-century, the church was once called Santa Maria Foris Portam, or Santa Maria Vecchia. Originally oriented towards an eastern apse, as was common with paleochristian churches, some state it was the first cathedral in the town. Some of the construction still dates to the 15th century, with blind arches next to the large windows. The sculpted columns at the entrance likely spolia from the 6th century. It was affiliated with a benedictine monastery, and was visited by St. Peter Damian while en route to die in the hermitage of Gamogna for the winter of 1072.

The interior was rebuilt and expanded starting in 1655, reversing the orientation, and adding a portico the entrance. Among the works inside are Gaspare Sacchi's altarpiece of the Virgin and Saints (1522) at the first altar on the left. In the chapel of St Bernard of Clairvaux to the right of the main altar are small canvases depicting the Life of St. Bernard (circa 1610) by Niccolò Paganelli.

The tall Romanesque bell-tower is a prominent landmark for the town. Built in the 9th century using likely Ancient Roman spolia, the unclad brick construction rises from a solid base but sports two rows of trifora windows. Prior to 1944, the top had a pointed spire and less windows, but damaged by gunnery, it was reconstructed to reflect a gothic decoration.
