= Zenobius (grammarian) =

Ancient Greek grammarian

Zenobios (Ancient Greek: Ζηνόβιος) was a Greek grammarian of an unknown era. He wrote a commentary on the Onomasticon of Apollonius Dyscolus, from which some fragments have been preserved.

In the 9th book of the Greek Anthology, there is also an epigram by a grammarian named Zenobios. Some scholars identify this Zenobios (the epigrammatist) with the sophist and proverb writer Zenobios, but others (like William Smith) reject this identification and leave the matter open.
