= Zenobius =

2nd-century Greek sophist and author

Zenobius (Ancient Greek: Ζηνόβιος) was a Greek sophist, who taught rhetoric at Rome during the reign of Emperor Hadrian (AD 117–138).

== Biography ==
He was the author of a collection of proverbs in three books, still extant in an abridged form, compiled, according to the Suda, from Didymus of Alexandria and "The Tarrhaean" (Lucillus of Tarrha, a polis in Crete). In the work, the proverbs are alphabetised and grouped by hundreds. This collection was first printed by Filippo Giunti in Florence, 1497.

Zenobius is also said to have been the author of a Greek translation of the Latin prose author Sallust, which has been lost, and of a birthday poem on the emperor Hadrian.

== See also ==
- Zenobius (grammarian)
