= Zanobi Poggino =

Italian painter

Zanobi Poggino of Zanobi di Poggino (16th century) was an Italian painter, active as a portrait and historical painter in Florence. He was a pupil of Giovanni Antonio Sogliani. While he was noted by Filippo Baldinucci, none of his works could be identified by Luigi Lanzi.
