= San Bartolomeo, Faenza =

Church building in Faenza, Italy

Coordinates: 44.2843°N 11.8813°E

San Bartolomeo is a Romanesque style Roman Catholic church located on Corso Matteotti, corner with via Scaletta, in Faenza, Italy.

== History ==
The church has an inscription dating to 1209. The layout of this church is similar to the contemporary San Lazzaro on Via Emilia. The facade and the church underwent reconstruction after the First World War, when it was dedicated as the Temple to those fallen in the previous wars.
