= William Henry Huddle =

American painter (1847–1892)

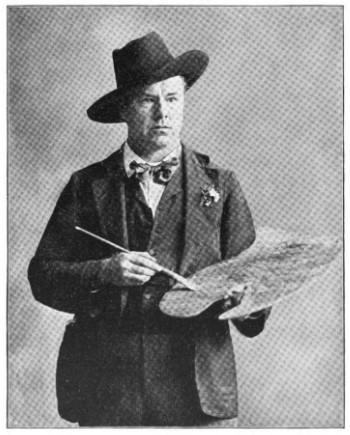
- Born: February 12, 1847; Wytheville, Virginia, US
- Died: March 23, 1892 (aged 45); Austin, Texas, US
- Education: National Academy of Design
- Known for: Painting
- Spouse: Nannie Carver

William Henry Huddle (February 12, 1847 – March 23, 1892) was an American painter famous for his portrait of Davy Crockett that hangs in the Texas State Capitol and his depiction of the surrender of Antonio López de Santa Anna. The Texas State Legislature commissioned Huddle to paint official portraits of the state's chief executives.

== Biography ==
He was born to Stephen G. and Nancy Foster Huddle on February 12, 1847 in Wytheville, Virginia. Huddle served in the Confederate States Army before moving to Texas with his family. He received his artistic training at the National Academy of Design in New York, New York and also in Munich, Germany. He married sculptor and artist Nannie Carver in 1889, and they had a daughter. He died March 23, 1892, and is buried in Oakwood Cemetery in Austin. Nannie died in 1951 and is buried next to him.

== Gallery ==
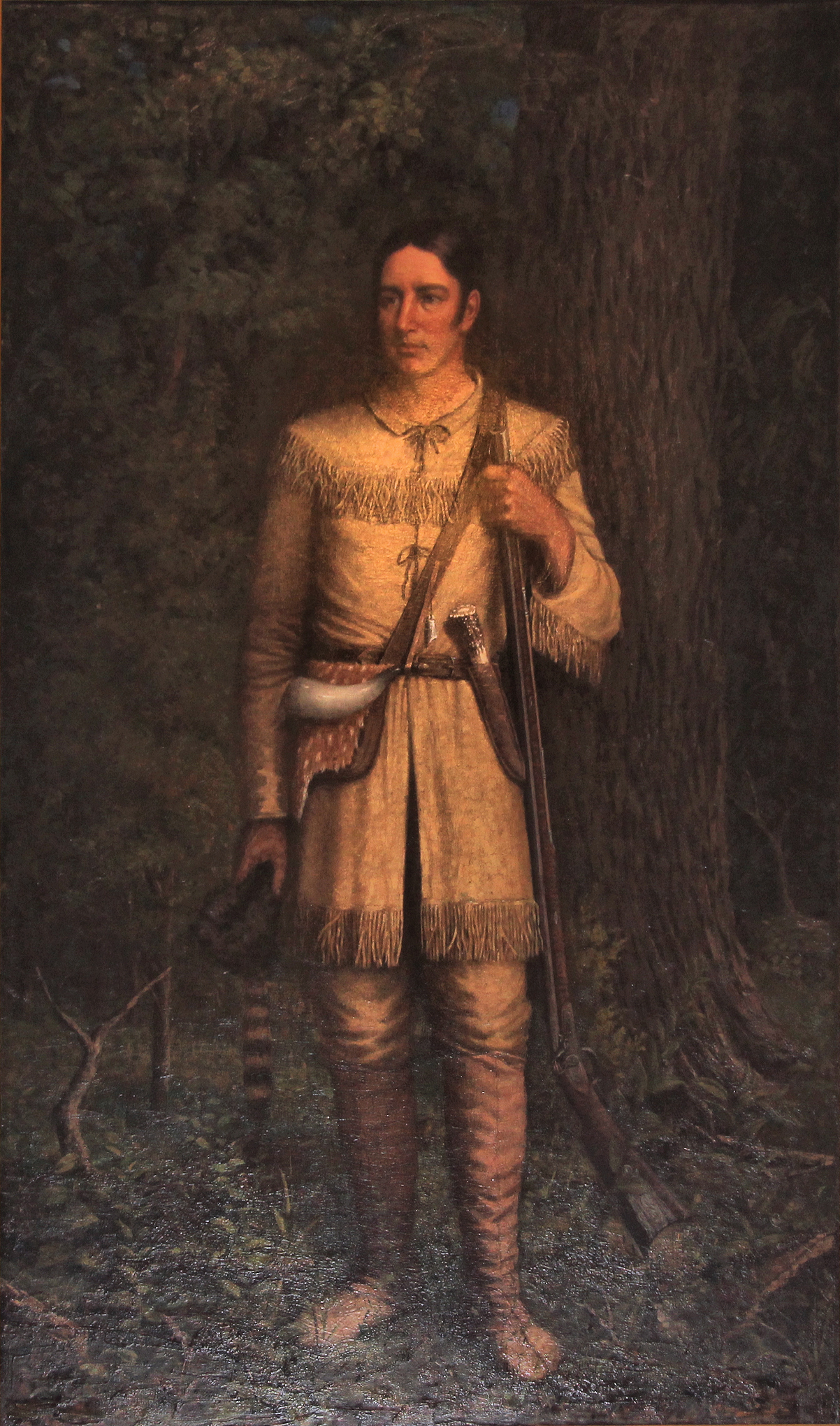
Davy Crockett

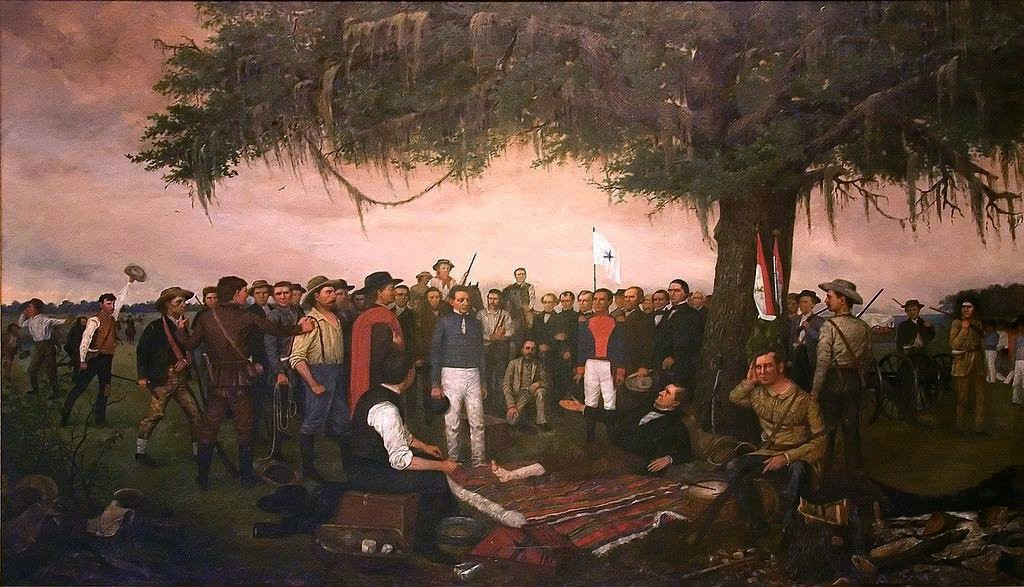
Surrender of Santa Anna

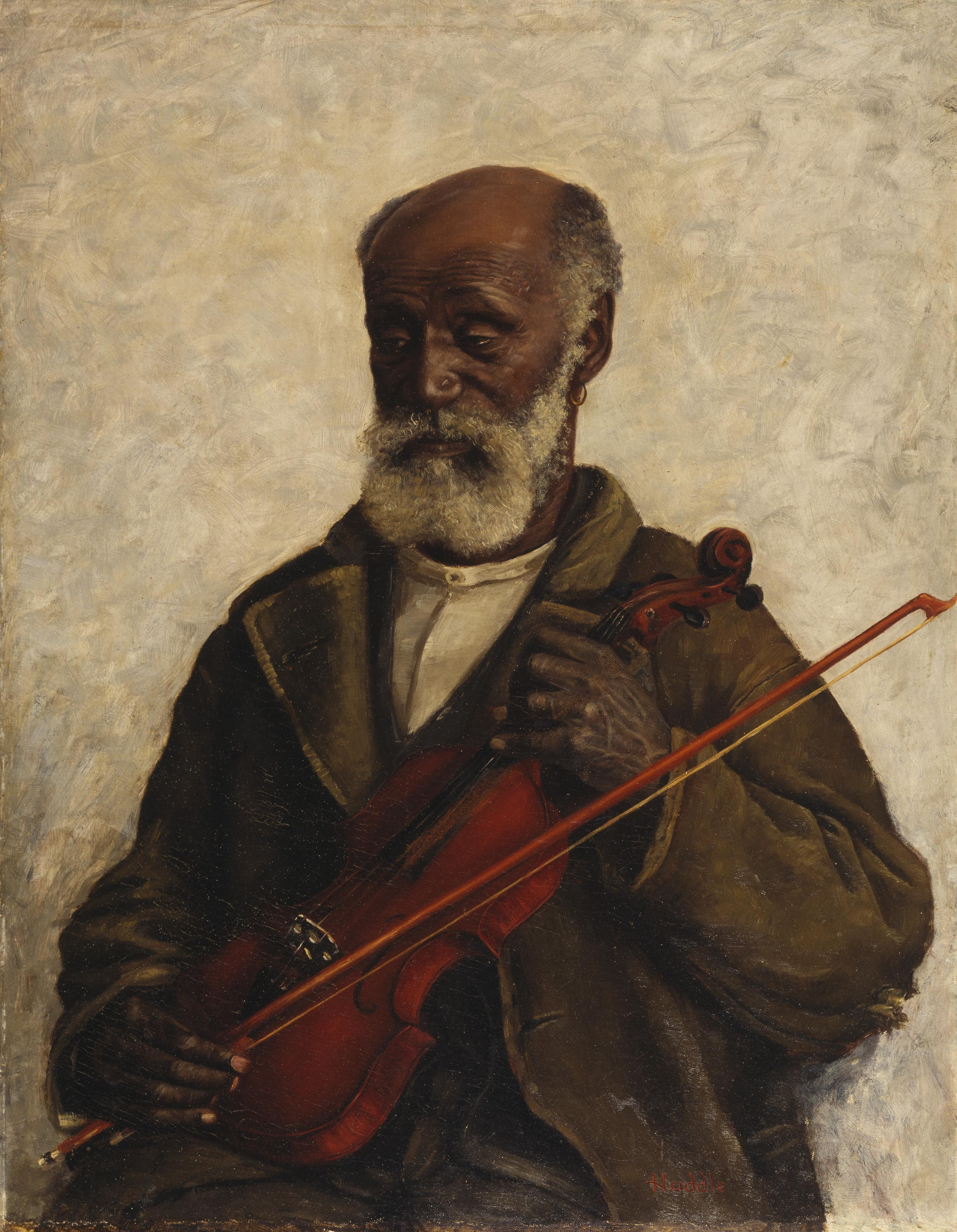
The Musician
