= Zenobios and Zenobia =

Christian martyrs

Saints Zenobius and Zenobia
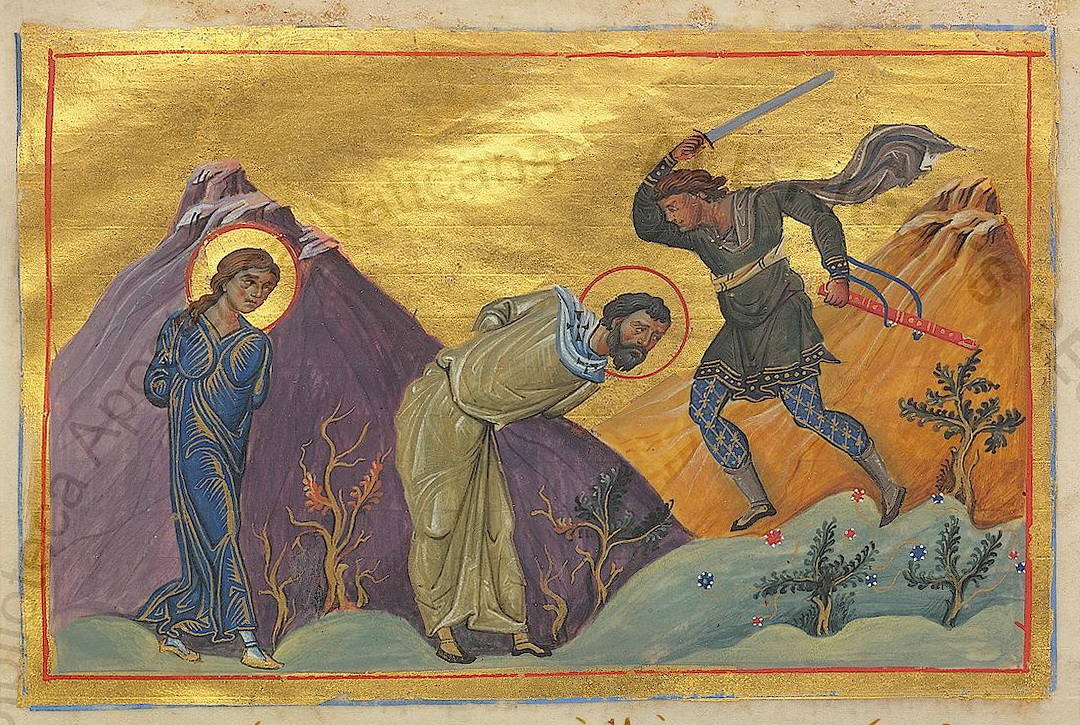

Martyrs
- Born: 3rd century AD
- Died: c. 290 AD; Aegae, Cilicia, Roman Empire
- Venerated in: Eastern Orthodox Church; Catholic Church
- Feast: 30 October

The Holy Martyrs Zenobios and Zenobia (died c.290; Greek:Ζηνόβιος καὶ Ζηνοβία; occasionally (and incorrectly) Σινόβιος καὶ Σινοβία; Latin: Zenobius et Zenobia, Slavonic: Зиновій и Зиновія) are recognized by Eastern Orthodox Church and the Roman Catholic Church; their day is October 30.

According to the Byzantine hagiography, Zenobius and his sister Zenobia were from Aegae, Cilicia. Zenobios was a physician and because of his divine healing powers he was consecrated bishop of Aegae. They were tortured and beheaded around 290, during Diocletian's persecutions.

It has been argued that the characters are mythological, possibly arisen from the confusion of the reading of martyrologies. Hippolyte Delehaye suggested a possible compilation by an unknown hagiographer who put together parts from the hagiography of Saints Cosmas and Damian with mentions of various saints named Zenobios/Zenobius.
