= Giovanni Antonio Sogliani =

Italian painter

Sogliani, Giovanni Antonio
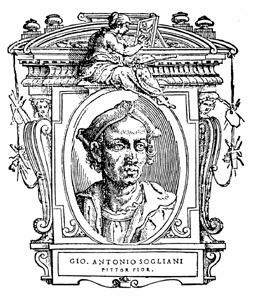
- Portrait of Giovanni Antonio Sogliani, 1568, illustration from "Le Vite" by Giorgio Vasari
- Born: Giovanni Antonio; 1492; Florence
- Died: 1544 (aged 51–52); Florence
- Known for: Painting
- Movement: Renaissance

Giovanni Antonio Sogliani (1492 – 17 July 1544) was an Italian painter of the Renaissance, active mainly in Florence.

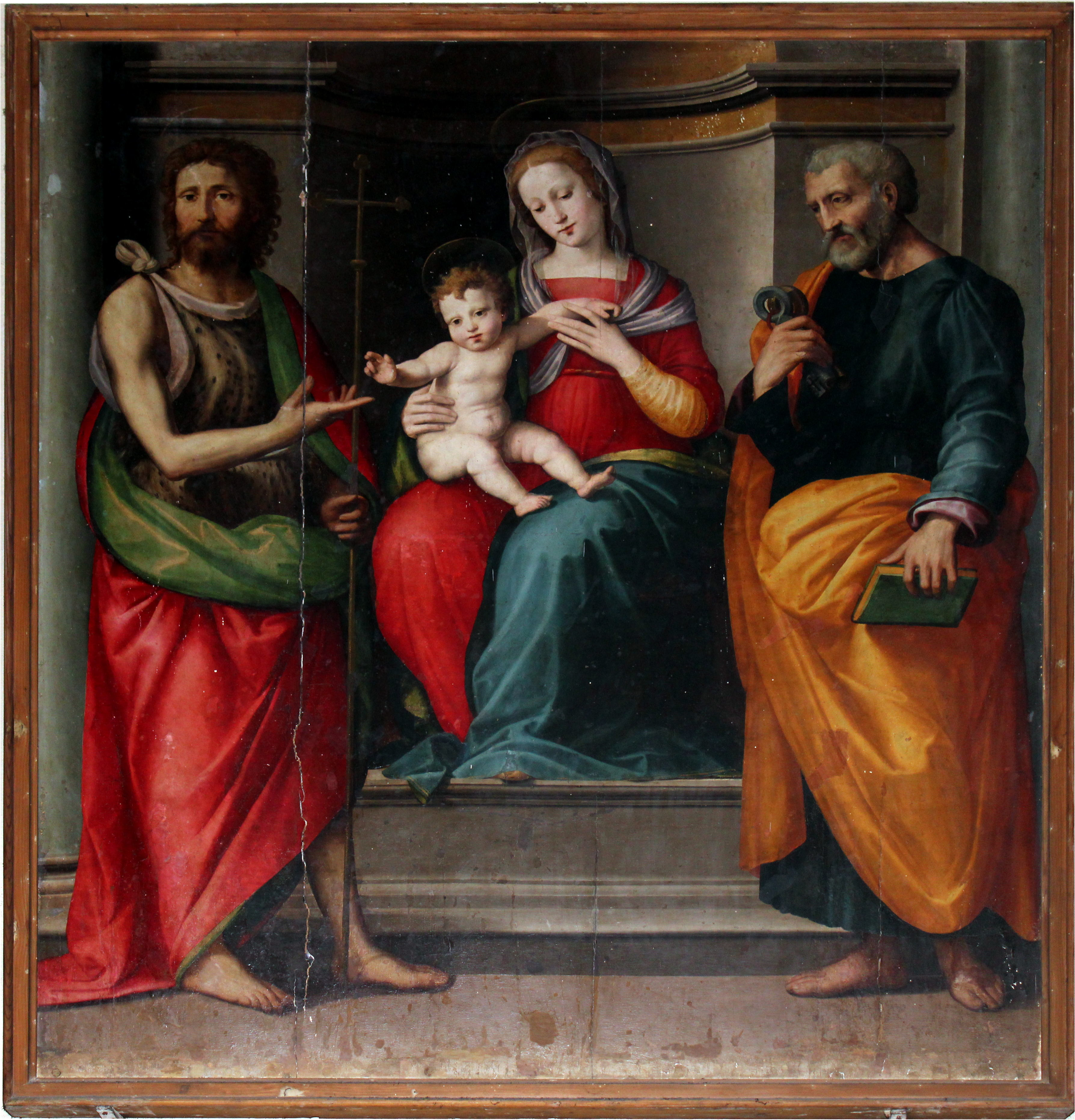
Madonna and Child with John the Baptist and Saint Peter, Santa Maria del Carmine, Pisa

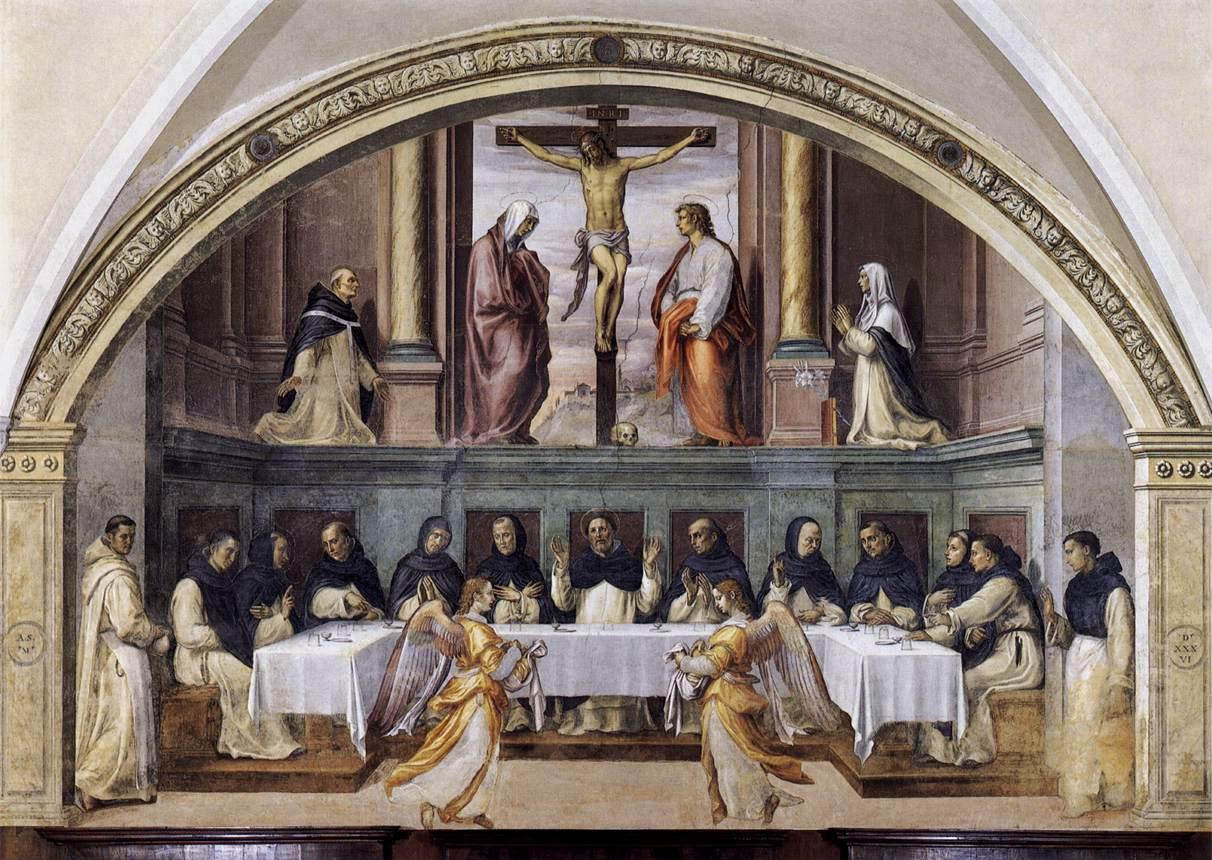
Giovanni Antonio Sogliani, St. Dominic and his Friars fed by Angels, fresco, 1536, Convent of San Marco, Florence

== Life and work ==
Giorgio Vasari in his Vite, the main source for Sogliani's biography, claimed that the painter had apprenticed with Lorenzo di Credi for two decades. While this length of time is impossible, Sogliani is documented as Credi's pupil for at least part of the 1510s and he was the executor of Lorenzo's will in 1531. Sogliani's earliest works, such as the tondo of the Madonna and Child with Two Angles at the Pinacoteca Capitolina in Rome, are stylistically very close to Lorenzo's.

Sogliani later entered some sort of partnership with Fra Bartolomeo's workshop at San Marco, monogramming his Annunciation at Santa Maria degli Innocenti, Florence, with Fra Bartolomeo and Albertinelli's workshop monogram "orate pro pictor" ("pray for the painter"). On his own, Sogliani completed, among other works, the Martyrdom of Saint Acacius (1521) for San Salvatore di Camaldoli (now in the basilica of San Lorenzo, Florence) and the fresco of the Miraculous Meal of Saint Dominic (1536) in the refectory of the convent of San Marco. Other important works include a panel of Saint Martin for a pillar at Orsanmichele and the altarpiece of Saint Bridget of Sweden Confirming her Rule (1522) for the convent of Santa Brigida al Paradiso, now at the Museo di San Marco.

Outside of Florence Sogliani painted two panels, a Last Supper (1531) and Christ Washing the Apostles' Feet (1531), for the collegiate church in Anghiari. He later painted several panels for the Cathedral of Pisa, where he finished commissions originally awarded to Andrea del Sarto and Perino del Vaga. The latter included three canvases for the Sacrifice of Abel, Sacrifice of Cain, and Sacrifice of Noah, completed by 15 May 1533 and in situ in the cathedral's apse. On 23 March 1536, he was commissioned the altarpiece of the Madonna and Child with Saints originally awarded to Andrea del Sarto.

One of Sogliani's most famous works is the Allegory of the Immaculate Conception at the Galleria dell'Accademia, Florence.

His pupils included Sigismondo Foschi and Zanobi Poggini.

== Sources ==
- Bencistà, Lucia. "Giovanni Antonio Sogliani tra le botteghe di San Marco e Gualfonda. Novità e precisazioni," in Fra Bartolomeo 1517, edited by Alessio Assonitis, Luciano Cinelli and Marilena Tamassia, pp. 181–194. Florence 2019.
- Nesi, Alessandro. "Due affreschi di Giovanni Antonio Sogliani nell’ex-Monastero di San Giuliano a Firenze", Arte cristiana, vol. CI, no. 876 (May–June 2013): pp. 175–182.
- Venturini, Lucia. "Una precisazione per Giovanni Antonio Sogliani e qualche nota sull’antico arredo della Compagnia del 'Raffa',” Arte, musica, spettacolo, vol. 1 (2000): pp. 237–244.
