= Huddle (website) =

Business news website

- Type: Online newspaper
- Owner(s): Acadia Broadcasting
- Founder(s): Lise Hansen; Allan Gates
- Founded: September 2015
- Ceased publication: July 25, 2023; 2 years ago
- Headquarters: Saint John, New Brunswick
- Website: huddle.today

Huddle, also known as Huddle Today, was a business news website based in Saint John, New Brunswick, while serving Atlantic Canada. It was founded in September 2015 in Saint John by Lise Hansen and Allan Gates, who both previously launched marketing company Bonfire Communications three years prior.

In 2019, Huddle was acquired by Irving-owned network Acadia Broadcasting. On July 25, 2023, it was announced that Huddle would be discontinued.
