= L. Zenobia Coleman =

American librarian (1898–1999)

Louie Zenobia Coleman

Louie Zenobia Coleman (January 21, 1898 – May 3, 1999) was an American librarian who worked for most of her career at Tougaloo College in Mississippi. She encouraged black people to become librarians and received an honorary lifelong membership from the American Library Association. The L. Zenobia Coleman library at Tougaloo College is named for her.

== Biography ==
Louie Zenobia Coleman was born in Childersburg, Alabama, on January 21, 1898 (or 1901) to parents who were farmers and homemakers. She attended Talladega College and received a BA in Education in 1921, and then studied education at the University of Chicago in 1925, 1926, and 1929.

Coleman started her career at Brick Junior College (later Franklinton Center) in Brick, North Carolina. She worked there as a librarian and teacher from 1924 to 1932. She attended the Columbia University School of Library Service and received her BS in Library Science in 1936. In 1943 she received a Master's in Library Science, again from Columbia.

In 1933 Coleman became a librarian at Tougaloo College in Tougaloo, Mississippi, near Jackson, where she worked for 36 years. Her efforts to become a full-fledged member of the academic library community were thwarted by Jim Crow laws and racism: Black librarians could only attend library associations' meetings using "freight elevators and service entrances", and were not allowed to attend banquets and other social gatherings. She persisted, and, according to her biography in Jessie Carney Smith's Notable Black American Women, "Black librarians today are beneficiaries of Coleman's courageous and selfless efforts".

In an unpublished manuscript Clarice Campbell, a former faculty member at Tougaloo, recorded an anecdote illustrating the pervasive racism in Jackson at that time. Campbell, who was White, was asked by Coleman to join her and Julia Bender, a Black assistant librarian, for the latter's 65th birthday dinner, which they had at a local cafeteria, "which was by then in compliance with the Civil Rights Act of 1964". Afterward, Campbell invited them to a meeting at Jackson's "White" church, but Bender "demurred, saying she had never gone where she was not wanted and did not propose to court trouble on her 65th birthday". Campbell nonetheless took the two Black women to the church, where she and one of her guests were forcibly pushed away from the door. Campbell notified the associate pastor, who told the "usher" that at this "Bishop's meeting" all were welcome. She then asked the usher to apologize, but he refused, and so the pastor apologized, and thanked the women for having chosen "one good way to serve [God] that evening". Campbell concluded, "for the two women it was an experience they would not want to repeat, but in hindsight it could be viewed with amusement and even satisfaction in knowing that they had further cracked the walls of segregation in the house of God."

During her tenure at Tougaloo she also helped other colleges strengthen their libraries. She assisted with cataloging at Alabama State College, gave instruction at Southern University in Baton Rouge, and was a visiting librarian at North Carolina College for Negroes. She published articles in library and education journals. Coleman became a member of a number of library associations and of advisory boards for schools, libraries, and library associations, and founded the local chapter for Alpha Kappa Alpha. In July 1973 she was made "Continuing Member for life" of the American Library Association.

== Legacy ==
A library at Tougaloo College, the Eva Hills Eastman Library, was built in 1948, but in the 1970s a new one was built and named for Coleman. Coleman started an endowment fund when she learned it was to be named for her, and after her retirement she continued to live in Tougaloo. She died on May 3, 1999.
