= Zenobia Gilpin =

American physician

- Born: Zenobia Gustava Gilpin about 1898; Richmond, Virginia
- Died: June 11, 1948; Richmond, Virginia
- Other names: Zenobia Henderson Gilpin, Zenobia Gilpin Henderson
- Occupations: Physician, clubwoman

Zenobia Gilpin (born about 1898 – June 11, 1948) was an American physician and clubwoman, and "one of the best known citizens of Richmond". An African-American physician during the Jim Crow era, she provided medical services to underserved black communities.

== Early life and education ==
Zenobia Gustava Gilpin was born in Richmond, Virginia, the daughter of St. James Gilpin and Cordelia A. Reese Gilpin. Her father owned a shoe store. Actor Charles Sidney Gilpin was her cousin. She graduated from Howard University in 1920, and from Howard University College of Medicine in 1923.

== Career ==
Gilpin had a medical practice in Richmond, and organized clinics at Black churches in the city. She was head of obstetrics at Richmond Community Hospital, secretary of the Virginia State Medical Association, and president of the Richmond Medical Society in 1930. She was the first Black woman doctor on the staff of Children's Memorial Clinic. She served on the City Lunacy Commission, and on the board of directors for the Phillis Wheatley branch of the YWCA. From 1936 until her death, she was secretary of the St. Philip Hospital Clinic. She chaired the Richmond chapter of Planned Parenthood. During World War II, she worked in the student clinic at Hampton Institute, presided over a fundraising concert, and organized a nutrition program for Richmond homemakers, to maximize healthy meals under rationing.

Gilpin was active in the NAACP and Alpha Kappa Alpha sorority. She was a founding member of the NAACP's Virginia State Conference, and first president of the Upsilon Omega Chapter of Alpha Kappa Alpha from 1925 to 1927. In 1932, on her way home from attending the Summer Olympics in Los Angeles, she was honored in Chicago at a luncheon hosted by fellow Black doctor Lillian Singleton Dove.

== Personal life and legacy ==
Gilpin married educator Welton Hamlet Henderson in 1943. She died in 1948, in her late forties, at her Richmond home. Her grave is located at Woodland Cemetery. A clinic was named in her memory, and more recently, Zenobia's Promise Foundation, founded in 2019 by the Upsilon Omega Chapter of Alpha Kappa Alpha, was also named in her memory. Her 1938 Bausch & Lomb microscope was displayed at the Black History Museum and Cultural Center in Richmond in 2018.
