= Zanobi Acciaioli =

Italian Dominican friar

Zanobi Acciaioli (25 May 1461 – 27 July 1519) was an Italian Dominican friar, a member of the Acciaioli family of Florence. He was Librarian of the Vatican under Leo X. He joined the Dominican convent on 8 December 1495. He learned Greek and Hebrew towards the latter part of his life, and was appointed in 1518 prefect of the Vatican Library.

Acciaioli worked mainly on translating Ancient Greek texts, including Olympiodorus on Ecclesiastes, a treatise of Eusebius against Hierocles, and Theodoret's Cure of the false Opinions of the Gentiles, and some other pieces. He died at the age of 58 in Rome.

In addition to his translations, Acciaiuoli also wrote a panegyric on the city of Naples; a Liber de vindicta Dei contra peccatores; and poems.

Acciaiuoli's own copy of his translation of Eusebius is in the Vatican Library. It includes corrections and annotations by him, and is signed on the title page, "F. Zenobii Acciolj".

== Works ==
=== Translations ===
- Eusebius. In Hieroclem. Dedicated to Lorenzo de' Medici. First published by Aldus in 1504.
- Olympiodorus. In Ecclesiasten. (Henri Estienne, 1512)
- Theodoret. De curatione Graecarum affectionum libri duodecim. (Paris, Henri Estienne, July 1519)
- Theodoret. De providentia Dei libri X.

=== Writings ===
- Acciaiuoli, Zanobi. Liber de vindicta Dei contra peccatores.
