= Zanobi da Strada =

Italian translator and scholar (1312–1361)

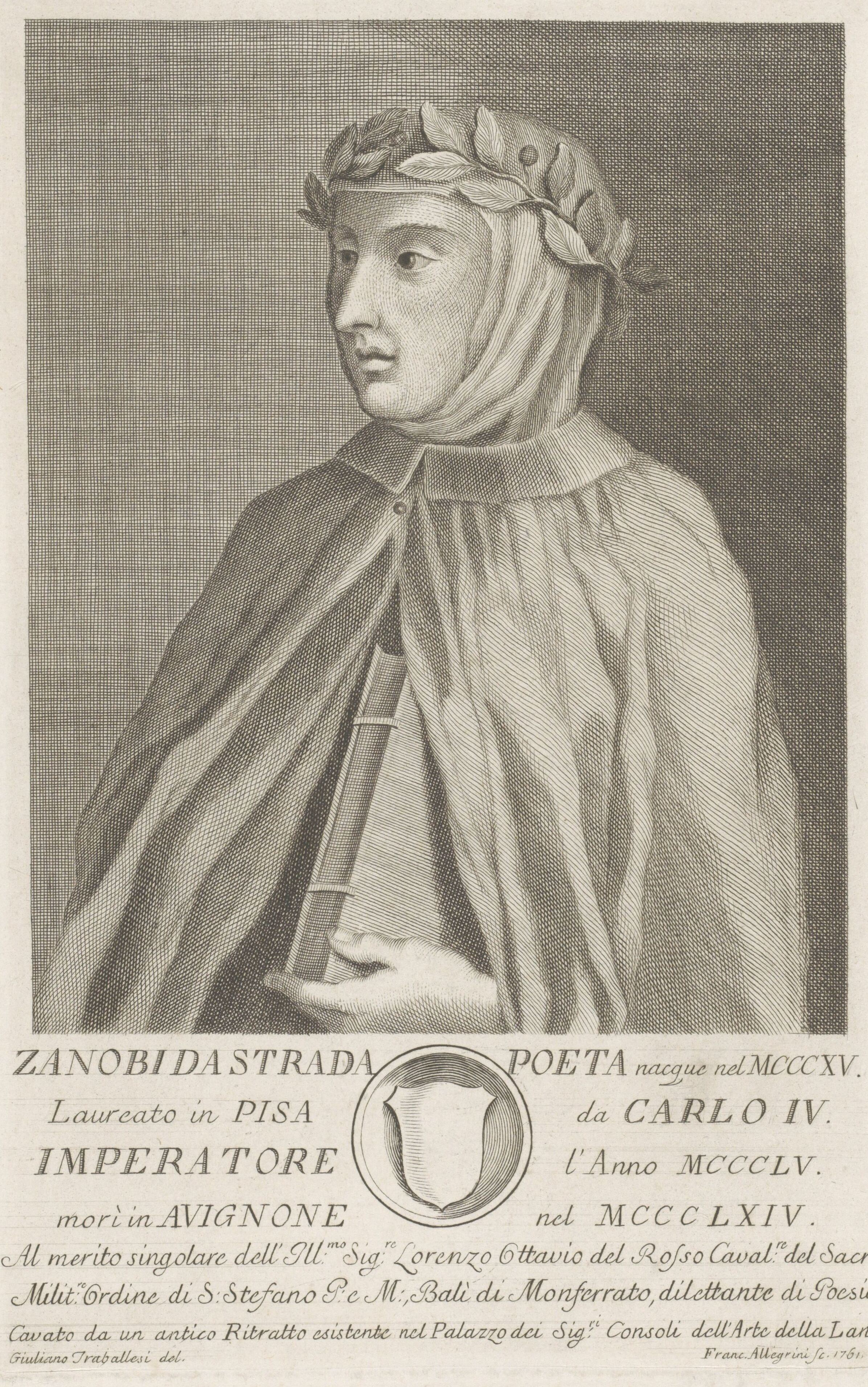
- Born: 1312 Strada, Florentine Republic
- Died: 1361 (aged 48–49) Avignon, Avignon Papacy
- Occupation: Poet
- Notable awards: Poet laureate

Zanobi da Strada (1312 – 1361 in Avignon), was an Italian translator, scholar and correspondent of Petrarch and a friend of Giovanni Boccaccio.

== Biography ==
Zanobi da Strada was born in Strata or Strada in Chianti, a hamlet or neighborhood within the town of Greve in Chianti, near Florence, Tuscany. He initially worked in Florence as a secretary for the King of Naples. He was responsible for some manuscript rediscoveries in the Monte Cassino monastery library to which he had access as secretary to the diocesan bishop and where he lived from 1355 to 1357. Early Apuleius MS marginalia (including the so-called spurcum additamentum, a pornographic interpolation at Met. 10.21.1) is in his hand.

Zanobi da Strada was crowned poet laureate by Charles IV on May 15, 1355, at Pisa, to the great disgust of Boccaccio, who declined to recognise the degree as legitimate. From there, Zanobi worked as an apostolic protonotary and secretary to pope Innocent VI. Zanobi would die in Avignon. Few of his verses survive. He was also a translator of some classic works, including the Morals by St. Gregory.
