= Nannie Zenobia Carver Huddle =

American painter (1860–1951)

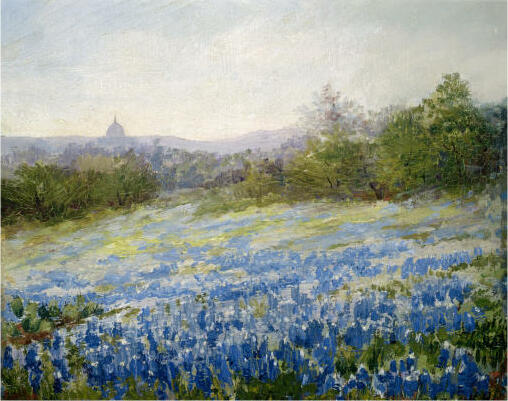
- Bluebonnets and the Capitol, c. 1910
- Born: January 28, 1860; Mobile
- Died: July 21, 1951 (aged 91); Austin
- Occupation: Painter, sculptor
- Spouse(s): William Henry Huddle

Nannie Zenobia Carver Huddle (January 28, 1860 – July 21, 1951) was an American painter. She is best known for her paintings of flowers, particularly fields of bluebonnets.

== Life and career ==
Nannie Zenobia Carver was born on January 28, 1860 in Mobile, Alabama, the third of six daughters of Benjamin Franklin Carver and Leonora Moss Carver. In the 1870s, the family relocated to Austin, Texas. She attended St. Mary's Academy in Austin, a Catholic school for girls. Her first art classes were at the school, with a nun named Sister Florentine. Sister Florentine asked artist William Henry Huddle to critique Carver's work, and he told her to paint a flower "so that it seems that you can reach around it," advice that was particularly influential.

Ten years later, in 1889, Nannie Carver and William Huddle married. They had a daughter before he died in 1892.

She resumed painting in 1894. She studied at the Art Students League from 1896 to 1898 and with William Merritt Chase, Wayman Adams, Marshall Troy, and Marshal Fry in New York, and with T. S. Frackelton, and Franz Bertram Aulich in Chicago.

She returned to Austin in 1900. There she studied sculpture under Elsabet Ney and developed a close friendship with Ney until Ney's death in 1907. Huddle's main focus was painting, particularly the wildflowers of Texas. She is thought to be one of the earliest painters of fields of Texas bluebonnets. She also painted portraits and was commissioned to paint US President Woodrow Wilson.

Huddle taught art at the Texas School for the Deaf from the 1900s to the 1940s.

Nannie Zenobia Carver Huddle died on 21 July 1951 in Austin.
