= Zenobia Galar =

Dominican painter

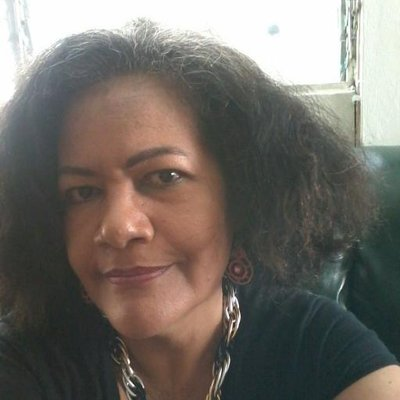
- Born: Zenobia Terrero Galarza; 3 May 1958 (age 66); Enriquillo, Dominican Republic
- Education: Universidad Autónoma de Santo Domingo
- Occupation: Painter

Zenobia Galar (born Zenobia Terrero Galarza; 3 May 1958) is a Dominican painter.

== Biography ==
Zenobia Terrero Galarza was born in Enriquillo, Barahona on 3 May 1958, the daughter of professor Elena Galarza de Terrero and the musician and soldier Francisco Corpus Terrero.

She is considered an important canvas artist in the Dominican Republic, and her works are part of multiple private collections in her country and abroad. She studied graphic and advertising arts at the School of Arts of the Universidad Autónoma de Santo Domingo (UASD), where she also studied the history of art and history of civilization. She attended the Escuela Nacional de Artes Visuales from 1975 to 1976, and the Círculo de Bellas Artes in Madrid, Spain in 1979.

Galar has served as a board member of the Dominican College of Plastic Artists, and was a painting teacher in its beginnings at educational institutions, as well as in its Painting Workshop, where she is still an instructor for both children and adults. She is also a lecturer and instructor in art subjects.

She has participated in various group exhibitions both locally and internationally in Spain and Colombia.

== Style ==
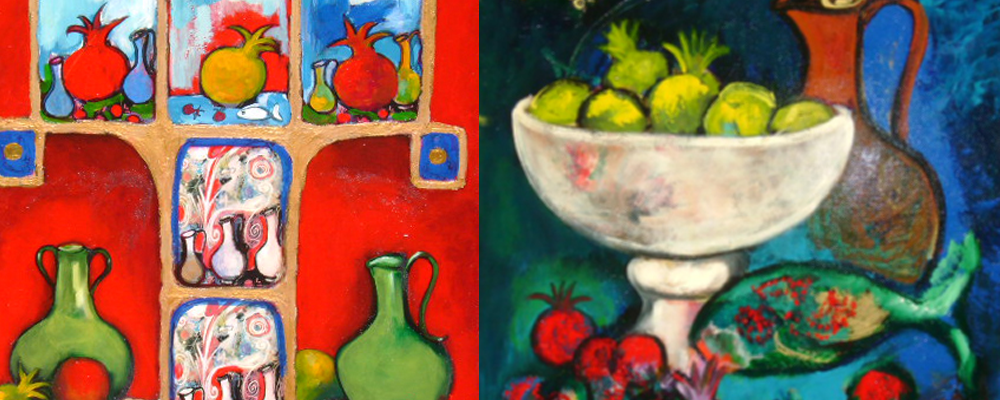
Still lifes by Galar

Galar prefers acrylic and oil, but also uses mixed techniques, such as collage. Her style is based on figurative neo-expressionism.

According to the art analyst Marianne De Tolentino,

Her art reflects her admiration for Picasso, Tamayo and the successful Dominican painter and sculptor, Alberto Ulloa. Still lifes particularly held our attention, because, at the turn of this century, when everything seems to have been said, from the refined subtlety of classicism to the latest passion for the subject in Cubism, a young painter believes that she has the right to speak. Her temperament makes her dismiss the minute accuracy learned in the academy, but neither does she indulge in a pleasant decorative interpretation or a flirtation with abstraction. Zenobia Galar reconstructs her models (real, imaginary) from a reality revised by her own sensitivity and fantasy, with an inclination towards neo-cubist two-dimensionality.

== Individual exhibitions ==
- 1987: Museo de las Casas Reales (Casa de Bastidas)
- 1991: Galería de Arte Amigas
- 1994: Colores Tropicales Casa Piantini
- 1994: Transformaciones Éticas y Estéticas Museo de Las Casas Reales
- 1995: Centro de Arte Contemporáneo Nouveau
- 1998: La Pintura y Yo, Fundación de Arte Contemporáneo Nouveau
- 2002: Vasijas Cósmicas, La Pintura Y Yo II Fundación Manuel del Cabral
- 2007: Vasijas Cósmicas en Homenaje a la Tierra, Museo de las Casas Reales
- 2013: Vivencias, Museo de las Casas Reales

== Collective exhibitions ==
- 1976: Escuela Nacional de Bellas Artes
- 1978: Facultad de Artes de la UASD
- 1977: XIV Bienal de Artes Visuales
- 1985: Gran Colectiva Centro de Arte Sebelen
- 1985: Secretaria de Turismo
- 1993: XVII Bienal de Artes Visuales, Museo de Arte Moderno
- 1995: XIX Bienal de Artes Visuales, Museo de Arte Moderno
- 1997: Fortaleza Ozama 12 Pintoras en la Pintura Dominicana
- 1997: Galería de Arte Corangel
- 1997: Secretaria Cultura
- 1998: Secretaria de Cultura La Mujer en El Arte
- 1992: Colectiva Galería Amigas
- 1995–1996: Artistas Contra el Cáncer, Centro Saint Joseph
- 2001: Artistas por la Paz UNESCO
- 2002: Por un Mundo sin Racismo, UNESCO
- 2003: Expo de La virgen De La Altagracia
- 2009–2016: Colectiva del CODAP
- 2012: Colectiva ARTECLUB
- 2015: Colectiva Centro Cultural Banreservas
- 2016: Colectiva Centro Cultural Banreservas
- 2018: Arte de Mujeres
- 2018: Flor de Cactus, Pintores del Sur
- 2018: Mujeres Creadoras
