= 1944 in architecture =

List of years in architecture	(table)
- … 1934; 1935; 1936; 1937; 1938; 1939; 1940; 1941; 1942; 1943; 1944; 1945; 1946; 1947; 1948; 1949; 1950; 1951; 1952; 1953; 1954 …
- Buildings and structures: Art; Archaeology; Architecture; Literature; Music; Philosophy; Science; +...

The year 1944 in architecture involved some significant events.

== Events ==
- March 9 – St. Nicholas Church, Tallinn, gutted during the bombing of Tallinn in World War II.
- Summer – Ministry of Works (United Kingdom) builds the first demonstration British temporary prefab houses designed for postwar reconstruction (in Northolt and on Millbank in London). The temporary wooden Jicwood bungalow is designed by Richard Sheppard in England.
- October – Destruction of Warsaw.
- The Greater London Plan and A Plan for Plymouth are published by Patrick Abercrombie.

== Buildings and structures ==
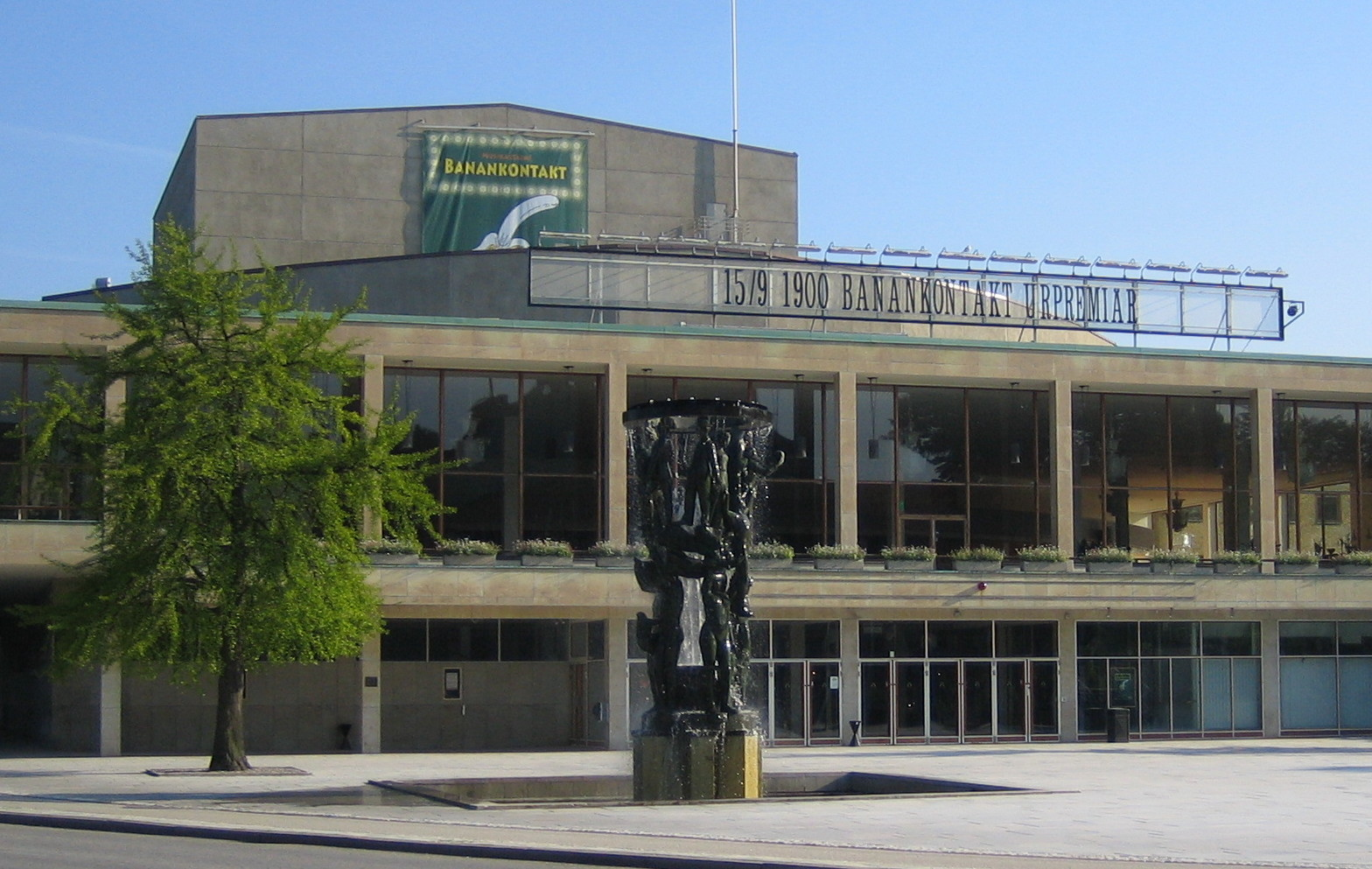
Malmö City Theatre, Sweden

=== Buildings ===
- Malmö City Theatre, Sweden, designed by Sigurd Lewerentz with Erik Lallerstedt and David Helldén in 1933, is completed.
- Fagersta airspace surveillance tower, Sweden, designed by Cyrillus Johansson, is completed.
- 10050 Cielo Drive (site of the Manson murders in 1969) is built.

== Awards ==
- AIA Gold Medal – Louis Sullivan.
- RIBA Royal Gold Medal – Edward Maufe.
- Grand Prix de Rome, architecture: Claude Béraud.

== Births ==
- January 2 – Bryan Avery, English architect (died 2017)
- January 9 – Massimiliano Fuksas, Italian architect
- January 19 – Thom Mayne, American architect
- January 25 – Bernard Tschumi, Swiss-born architect
- April 6 – Peter Murray, English architectural journalist
- April 24 – Maarja Nummert, Estonian architect
- June 1 – Rafael Viñoly, Uruguayan-born architect (died 2023)
- June 14 – Simo Paavilainen, Finnish architect
- July 15 – Stephen A. Lesser, American architect
- August 19 – Adrian Smith, American architect
- September 27 – Jan Utzon, Danish architect
- November 17 – Rem Koolhaas, Dutch architect
- December 23 – Samuel Mockbee, American architect (died 2001)
- Dick Clark, American architect
- Spencer de Grey, English architect
- David Miller, American architect

== Deaths ==
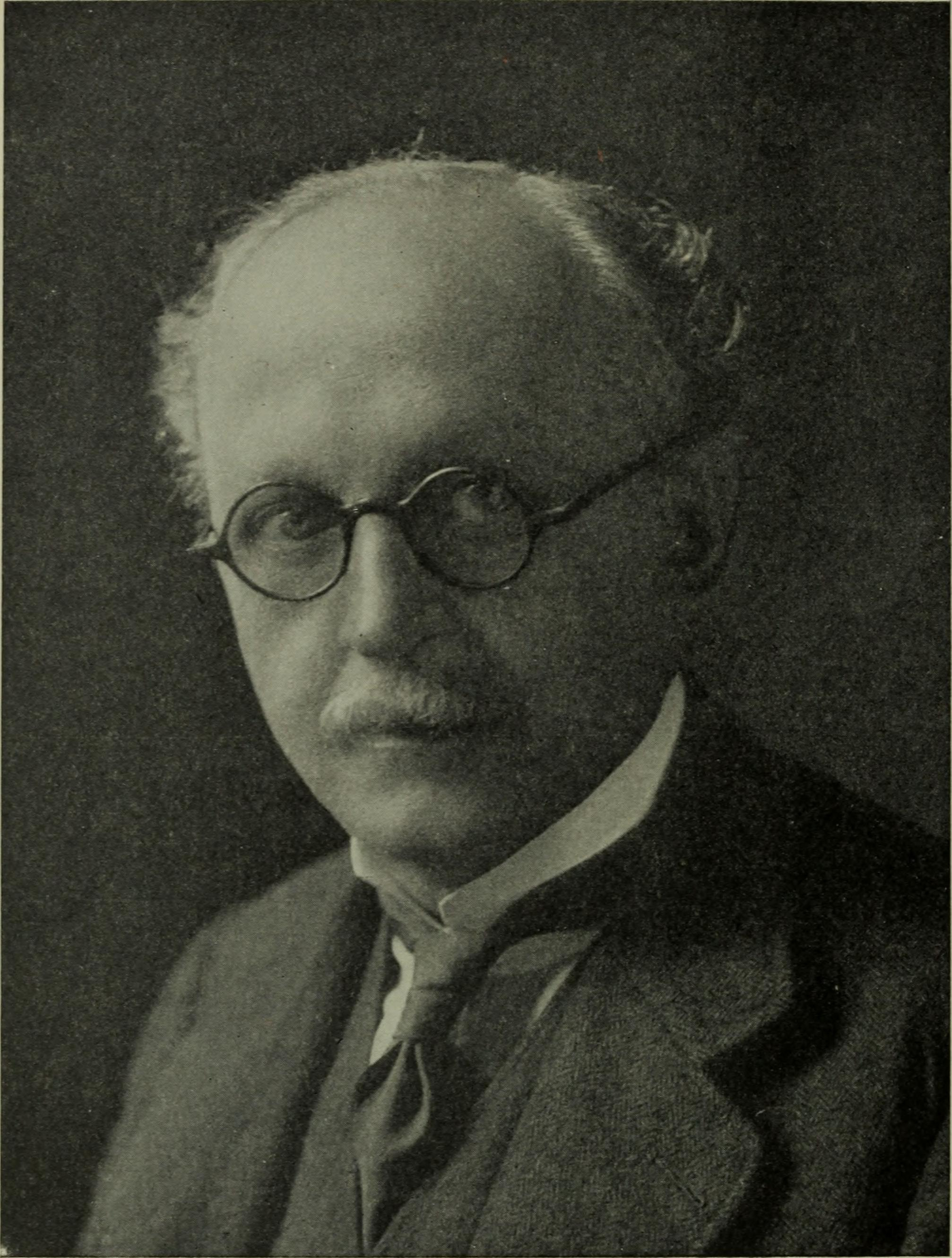
Edwin Lutyens

- January 1 – Sir Edwin Lutyens, English architect (born 1869)
- March 8 – Rudolf Wels, Czech architect, killed in Auschwitz concentration camp (born 1882)
- April 4 – Morris H. Whitehouse, American architect (born 1878)
- April 10 – Henry Price, English architect working in Manchester (born 1867)
- May 8 – Alexander Beer, German architect, died in Theresienstadt concentration camp (born 1873)
- May 26 – Walter Brugmann, Nazi German architect, died in aircraft crash (born 1887)
- September 6 – Clarence Perry, American town planner (born 1872)
- October 7 – P. Morley Horder, English architect (born 1870)
- October 23 – Wilson Eyre, American architect (born 1858)
- November 12 – Samuel Charles Brittingham, Australian architect (born 1860)
- December 4 – Benjamin Wistar Morris, American architect (born 1870)
- December 25 – Henry Budden, Australian architect (born 1871)
- Harry Little, American architect
- Watson Elkinah Reid, Canadian architect (born 1858)
