= 1941 in architecture =

List of years in architecture	(table)
- … 1931; 1932; 1933; 1934; 1935; 1936; 1937; 1938; 1939; 1940; 1941; 1942; 1943; 1944; 1945; 1946; 1947; 1948; 1949; 1950; 1951 …
- Buildings and structures: Art; Archaeology; Architecture; Literature; Music; Philosophy; Science; +...

The year 1941 in architecture involved some significant events.

== Buildings and structures ==
=== Buildings ===
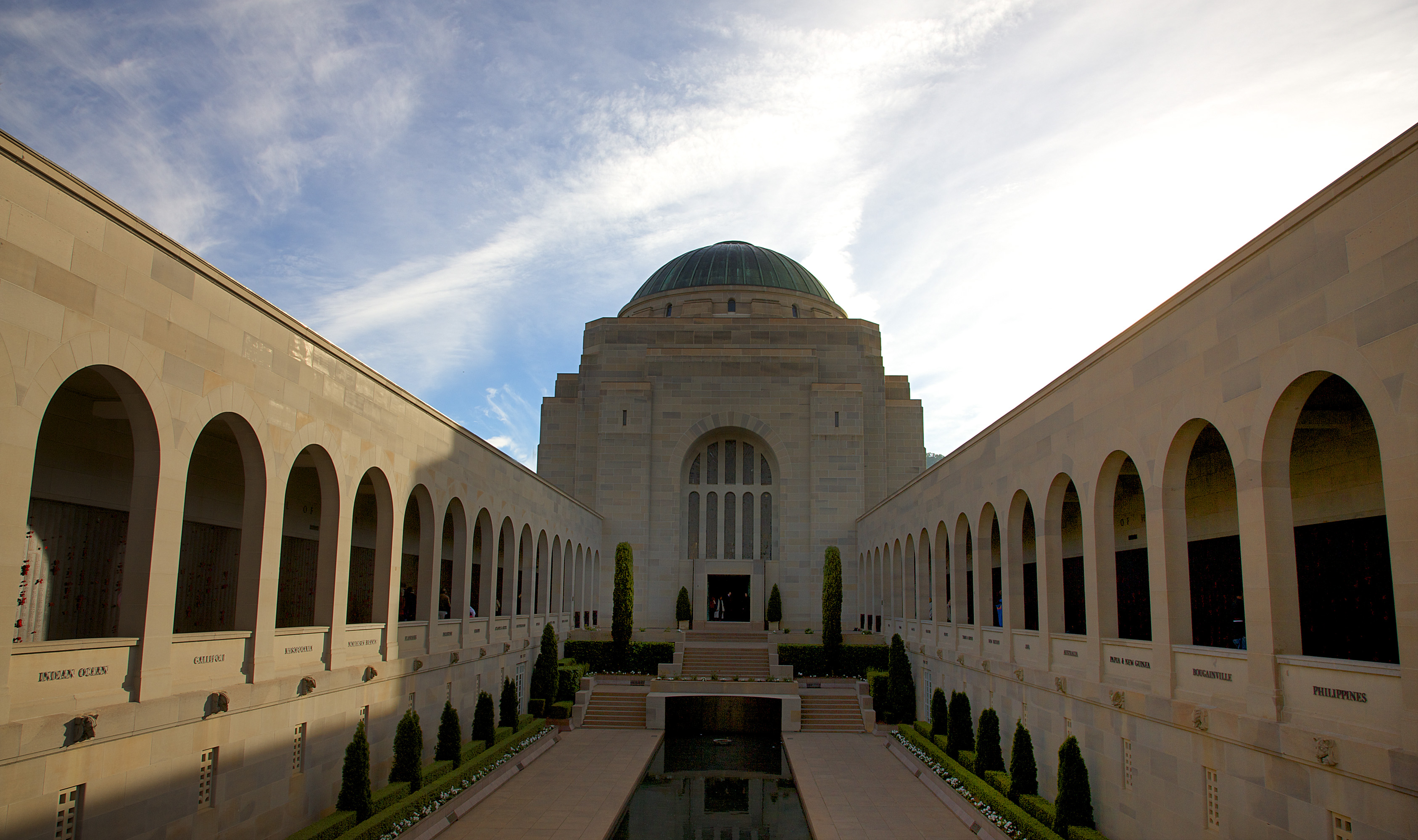
Australian War Memorial

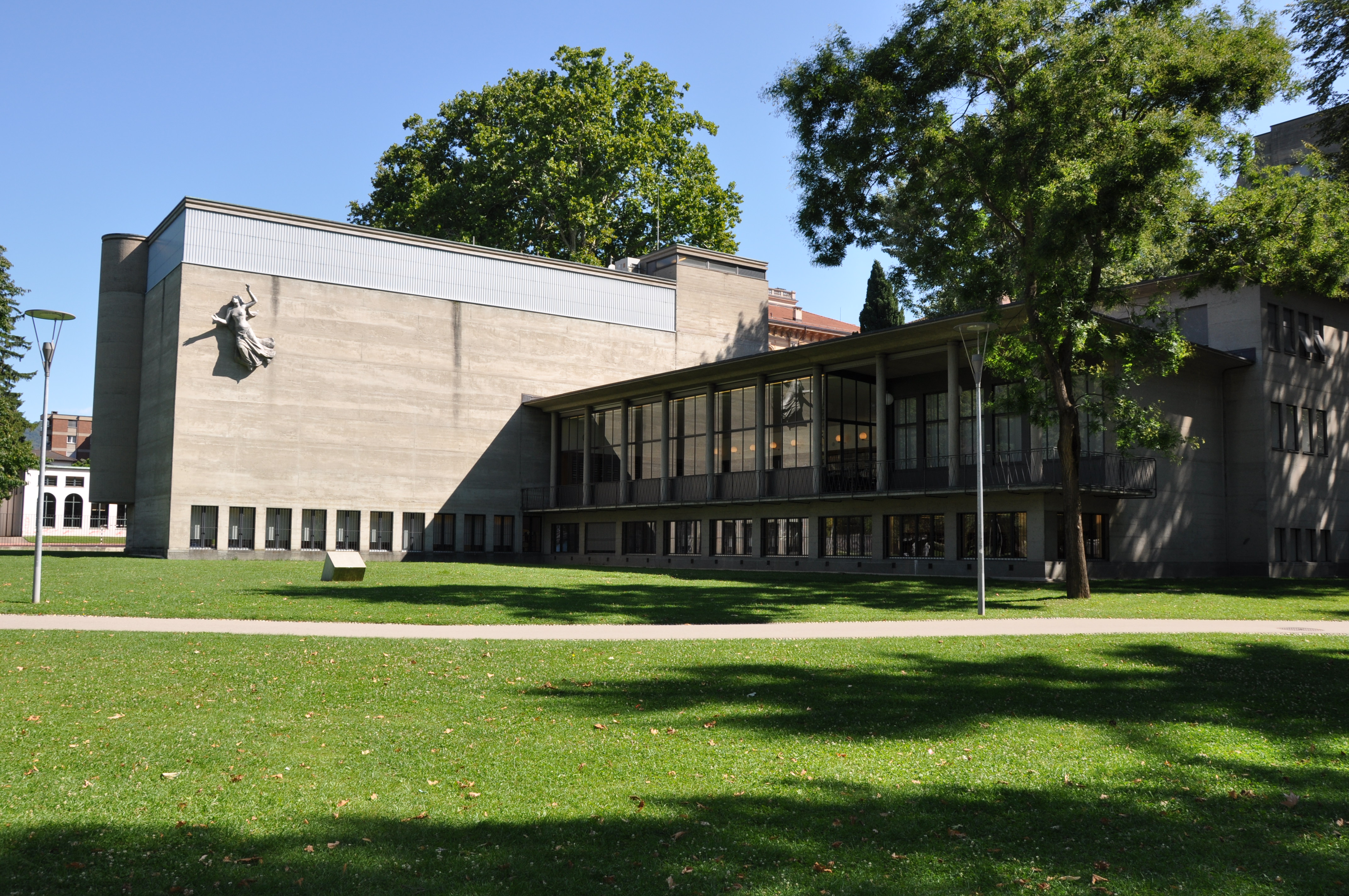
Biblioteca Cantonale in Lugano, Switzerland

- Hoover Tower in Stanford, California, United States, designed by Arthur Brown, Jr., completed.
- Fen Court at Peterhouse, Cambridge, England, designed by H. C. Hughes and Peter Bicknell, completed.
- Dublin Airport passenger terminal, Ireland, designed by Desmond FitzGerald, opened.
- Australian War Memorial in Canberra, Australia, completed.
- Lord Elgin Hotel in Ottawa, Ontario, Canada, completed.
- Smith-Reynolds Airport in Winston-Salem, North Carolina, United States, completed.
- Replica of the Parthenon, in concrete, in Nashville, Tennessee, completed.
- Presidential Palace of Tirana, in Tirana, Albania, completed.
- Karlskoga city hall in Sweden designed by Sune Lindström.
- National and University Library of Slovenia in Ljubljana, designed by Jože Plečnik in 1930/31, completed.
- Biblioteca Cantonale (Cantonal Library) in Lugano, Canton of Ticino, Switzerland, designed by Rino and Carlo Tami, completed.
- St Peter's Church, Grange Park, Enfield, London, designed by Cyril Farey, built using recycled materials.
- Willow Run Bomber Plant, Michigan, designed by Albert Kahn.
- Schwerbelastungskörper, Berlin, Germany, built by Dyckerhoff & Widmann AG.
- Kahn House in Ngaio, New Zealand, designed by Ernst Plischke, completed.

== Awards ==
- RIBA Royal Gold Medal – Frank Lloyd Wright.
- Grand Prix de Rome, architecture: no competition.

== Births ==
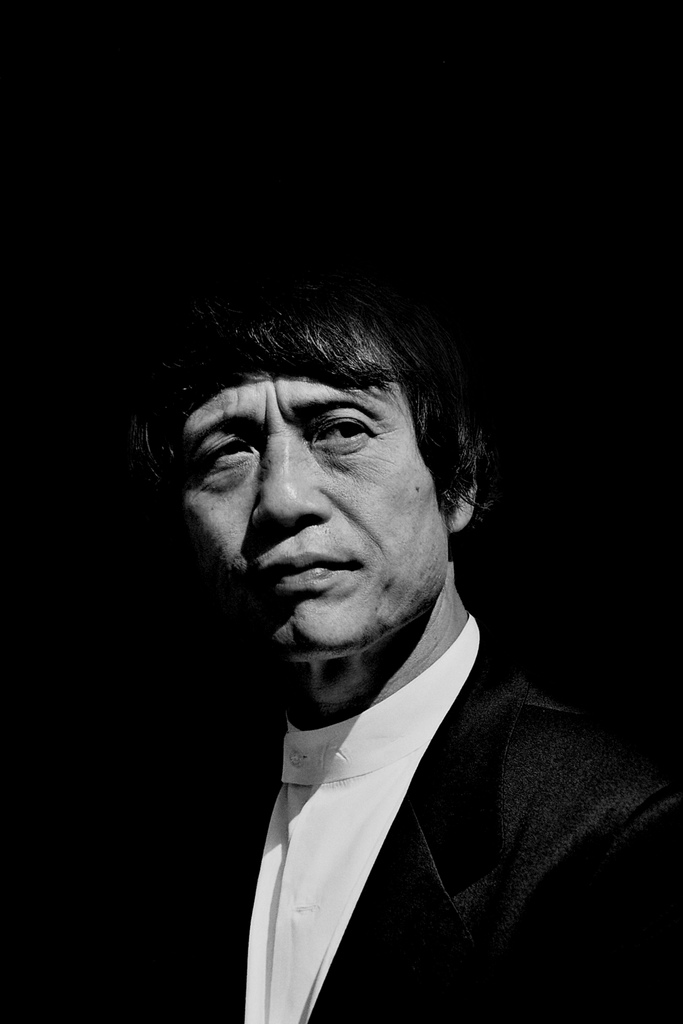
Tadao Ando

- March 3 – Vlado Milunić, Czech architect (died 2022)
- April 1 – David Childs, American architect
- May 6 – Peter Corrigan, Australian architect (died 2016)
- June 1 – Toyo Ito, Japanese architect
- September 13 – Tadao Ando, Japanese "critical regionalist" architect
- approximate date – Yasmeen Lari, Pakistani architect

== Deaths ==
- February 12 – Charles Voysey, English Arts and Crafts designer and domestic architect (born 1857)
- August 26 – Sir Alfred Gelder, English architect and politician active in Kingston upon Hull (born 1855)
- September 2 – H. Craig Severance, American architect active in New York (born 1879)
- December 30 – El Lissitzky, Russian artist, designer, photographer, typographer, polemicist and architect (born 1890)
