= 1942 in architecture =

List of years in architecture	(table)
- … 1932; 1933; 1934; 1935; 1936; 1937; 1938; 1939; 1940; 1941; 1942; 1943; 1944; 1945; 1946; 1947; 1948; 1949; 1950; 1951; 1952 …
- Buildings and structures: Art; Archaeology; Architecture; Literature; Music; Philosophy; Science; +...

The year 1942 in architecture involved some significant events.

== Events ==
- April 25 – Marriage of English architects Jane Drew and Maxwell Fry in London.
- May 30/31 – Bombing of Cologne in World War II: The first 1,000 bomber raid and associated fires destroy 3,330 non-residential buildings and make 13,000 families homeless; eleven of the twelve Romanesque churches of Cologne are damaged.
- September – Alker Tripp publishes Town Planning and Road Traffic in England, advocating segregated roads.
- An abridged version of the Athens Charter by Le Corbusier is published.

== Buildings and structures ==
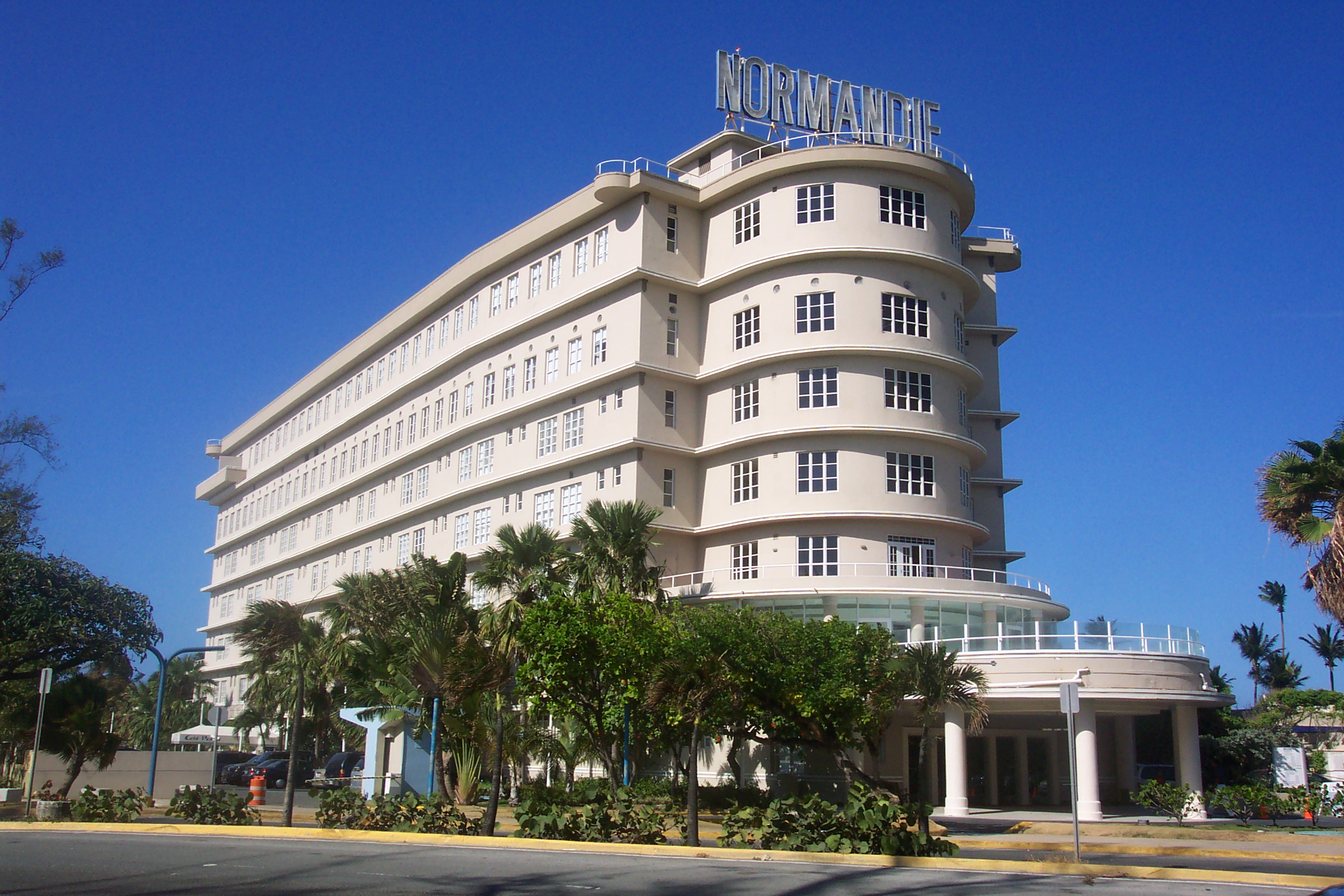
Normandie Hotel, San Juan

=== Buildings ===
- October 10 – The Normandie Hotel in San Juan, Puerto Rico, designed by engineer Félix Benítez Rexach and architect Raúl Reichard, is opened.
- The National Naval Medical Center in Bethesda, Maryland, United States is completed.
- Walthamstow Town Hall in London, designed by Philip Hepworth in 1932, is completed.
- Wythenshawe Bus Garage in Manchester, England is completed.

== Awards ==
- RIBA Royal Gold Medal – William Curtis Green.
- Grand Prix de Rome, architecture – Raymond Gleize?

== Births ==
- January 19 – John Sheehy, American architect
- February 1 – Tonny Zwollo, Dutch-born architect
- March 23 – Fabio Reinhart, Swiss architect
- September 15 – Ksenia Milicevic, Yugoslav-born French painter, architect and town planner
- Patty Hopkins, born Patricia Wainwright, English architect
- Roger Walker, New Zealand architect

== Deaths ==
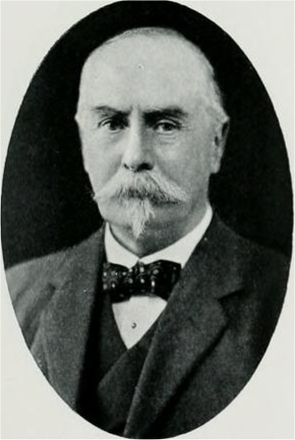
Blomfield in 1921

- March 31 – Randall Wells, English Arts and Crafts architect (born 1877)
- May 17 – Mārtiņš Nukša, Latvian architect and diplomat (born 1878; executed)
- May 20 – Hector Guimard, French-born Art Nouveau architect (born 1867)
- May 23 – C. R. Ashbee, English interior designer (born 1863)
- June 25 – Arthur Anderson, Australian architect (born 1868)
- July 24 – Sir Edwin Cooper, English architect (born 1874)
- September 22 – Ralph Adams Cram, American collegiate and ecclesiastical architect (born 1863)
- December 8 – Albert Kahn, German American industrial architect (born 1869)
- December 13 – Robert Robinson Taylor, first accredited African-American architect (born 1868)
- December 27 – Reginald Blomfield, English architect (born 1856)
- Ernest George Trobridge, British architect (born 1884)
