= 1935 in architecture =

List of years in architecture	(table)
- … 1925; 1926; 1927; 1928; 1929; 1930; 1931; 1932; 1933; 1934; 1935; 1936; 1937; 1938; 1939; 1940; 1941; 1942; 1943; 1944; 1945 …
- Buildings and structures: Art; Archaeology; Architecture; Literature; Music; Philosophy; Science; +...

The year 1935 in architecture involved some significant architectural events and new buildings.

== Events ==
- May 29 – Compagnie Générale Transatlantique ocean liner SS Normandie, with Art Déco and Streamline Moderne interiors designed under the supervision of Roger-Henri Expert, begins her maiden voyage.

== Buildings and structures ==
=== Buildings opened ===
- May 31 - Jubilee Pool, Penzance in Cornwall, England by Frank Latham.
- June 2 – Saint Constantine and Elena Cathedral, Bălți, Moldova.
- July 6 – New building for Museum Boijmans, Rotterdam, by Ad van der Steur.
- July 13 – Shoreham Airport terminal building in England, by Stavers Tiltman.
- July 22 – Odeon, Kingstanding cinema in Birmingham, England, by Harry Weedon and Cecil Clavering.
- August 3 – Church of the Good Shepherd, Lake Tekapo, South Island of New Zealand, by Richard Strachan De Renzy Harman after Esther Hope, is consecrated.
- August 5 – Eastbourne Bandstand in Eastbourne, England.
- September 30 – Boulder Dam, by John L. Savage (design engineer) with Gordon Kaufmann (supervising architect), is dedicated.
- November 4 – Hornsey Town Hall, London, by Reginald Uren.
- November 5 – Faringdon Folly tower, England, by Lord Gerald Wellesley for Lord Berners.
- November 18
  - Freedom Monument in Riga, Latvia, by Kārlis Zāle, is unveiled.
  - Opelwerk Brandenburg, Germany, begins production, 190 days after the laying of the foundation stone.

=== Buildings completed ===
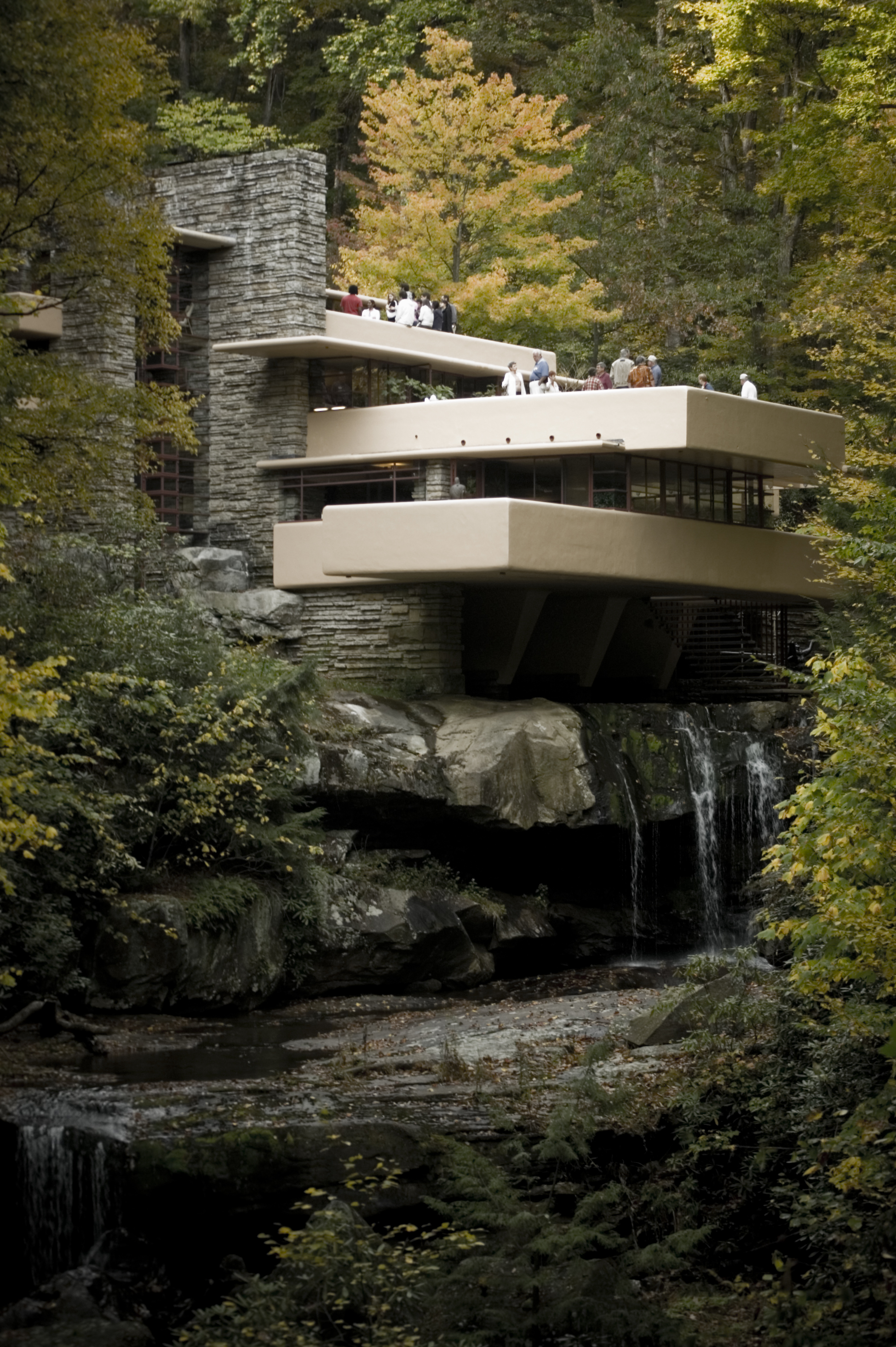
Fallingwater

- Fallingwater in southwestern Pennsylvania, designed by Frank Lloyd Wright
- Florya Atatürk Marine Mansion, Istanbul, designed by Seyfi Arkan and gifted to Mustafa Kemal Atatürk
- Highpoint I apartment block, Highgate, north London, by Berthold Lubetkin with structural design by Ove Arup
- De La Warr Pavilion, Bexhill-on-Sea, England, by Erich Mendelsohn and Serge Chermayeff
- Supreme Court of the United States by Cass Gilbert, completed posthumously
- Von Sternberg House, Northridge, California, by Richard Neutra
- Stern House, Houghton Estate, Johannesburg, South Africa, by Rex Distin Martienssen and partners
- Villa Necchi Campiglio, Milan, by Piero Portaluppi
- Stockholm Collective House by Sven Markelius with Alva Myrdal
- Dispensario Antituberculoso, Barcelona, by Josep Lluís Sert
- An-Nasr Mosque, Nablus, Palestine
- Grand Mosque of Mopti, French Sudan
- El Omrane Mosque, Tunis
- Sacred Heart Cathedral, New Delhi, India, designed by Henry Medd
- Church of Our Lady and the First Martyrs, Heaton, West Yorkshire, England, designed by J. H. Langtry-Langton
- Gothenburg Concert Hall, Sweden, designed by Nils Einar Ericsson
- Vyborg Library, Finland, designed by Alvar Aalto
- Gemeentemuseum Den Haag, Netherlands, designed by Hendrik Petrus Berlage

== Exhibitions ==
- Opened to the public April 19 - Industrial arts exposition at the Forum at Rockefeller Center in New York City; where models and plans for Frank Lloyd Wright's proposed Broadacre City were displayed for the first time.

== Awards ==
- RIBA Royal Gold Medal – Willem Marinus Dudok.
- Grand Prix de Rome, architecture – Paul Domenc.

== Births ==
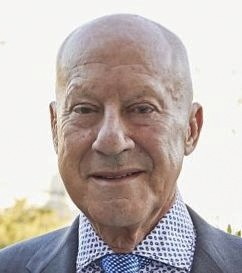
Norman Foster

- March 3 – Corinne Bennett, née Wilson, English conservation architect (died 2010)
- May 7 – Michael Hopkins, English architect (died 2023)
- June 1 – Norman Foster, English architect, head of international design practice Foster and Partners
- November 20 – Imre Makovecz, Hungarian architect (died 2011)
- October 27 – Giorgio Grassi, Italian architect
- October 31 – John Melvin, English architect

== Deaths ==
- March 27 – Francis Rattenbury, English architect, worked chiefly in Canada (born 1867; murdered)
- April 5 – Basil Champneys, English architect and author (born 1842)
- July 6 – Claude Ferrier, British Art Deco architect (born 1879)
- July 7 – George W. Keller, American architect and engineer (born 1842)
- September 2 – Sir Henry Tanner, English public building architect (born 1849)
