= 1869 in architecture =

The year 1869 in architecture involved some significant architectural events and new buildings.

== Events ==
- Construction of Neuschwanstein in Bavaria, designed by Christian Jank, is begun.

== Buildings and structures ==
=== Buildings opened ===
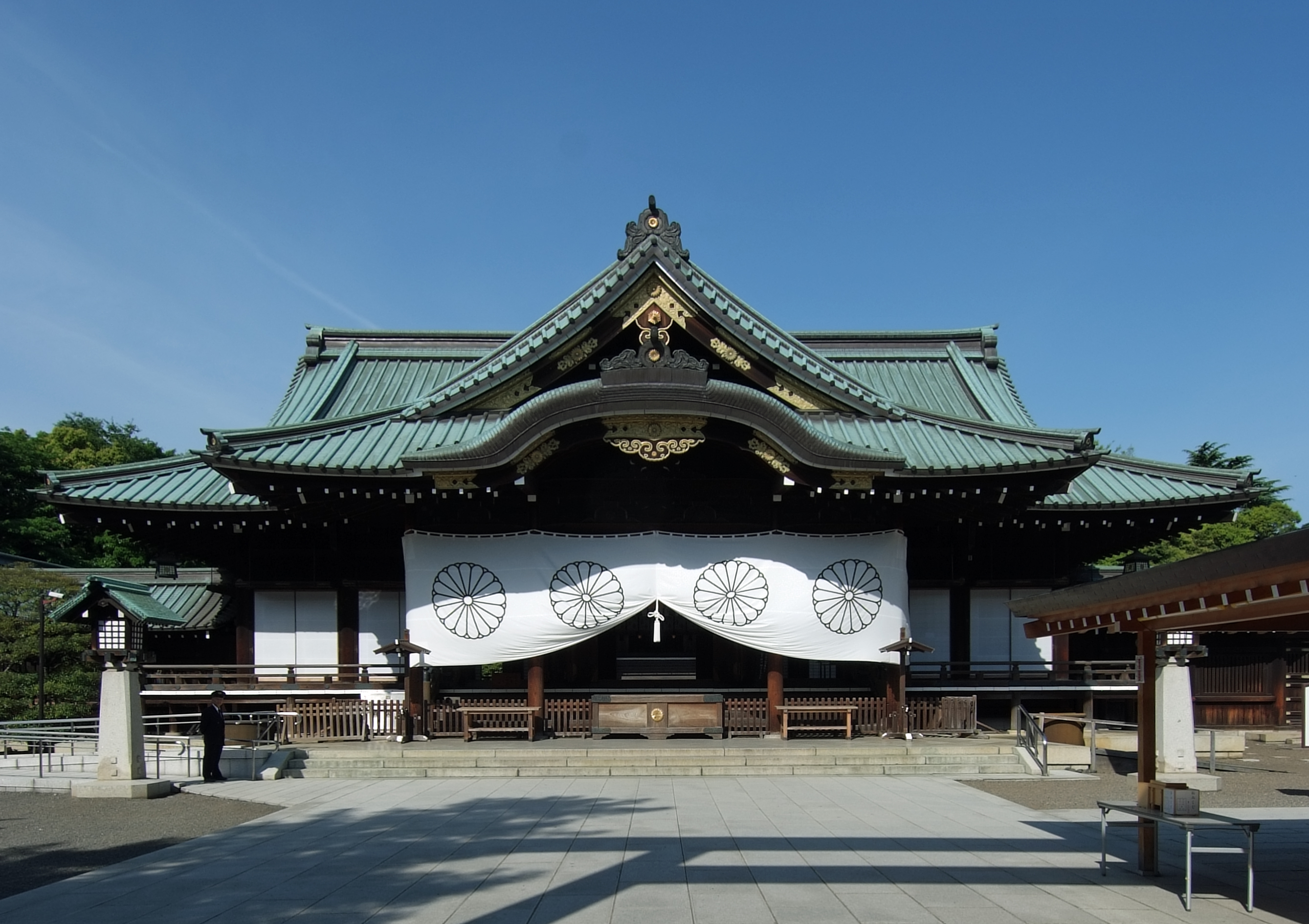
Yasukuni Shrine

- February 3 – Booth's Theatre, New York City, United States.
- May 12 – Chapel of St John's College, Cambridge, England, designed by George Gilbert Scott, consecrated.
- May 25 – Vienna State Opera, constructed by Josef Hlávka to designs by August Sicard von Sicardsburg and Eduard van der Nüll. van der Nüll hanged himself in 1868 in disappointment at the public reaction to the design and von Sicardsburg died of tuberculosis a few months later.
- June – Yasukuni Shrine, Tokyo, Japan.
- October 19 – St Barnabas Church, Oxford, England, designed by Arthur Blomfield, consecrated.
- November 6 – Blackfriars Bridge, London, England.
- November 17 – The modern Suez Canal.
- December 31 – St Stephen's Church, Rosslyn Hill, London, designed by S. S. Teulon.

=== Buildings completed ===
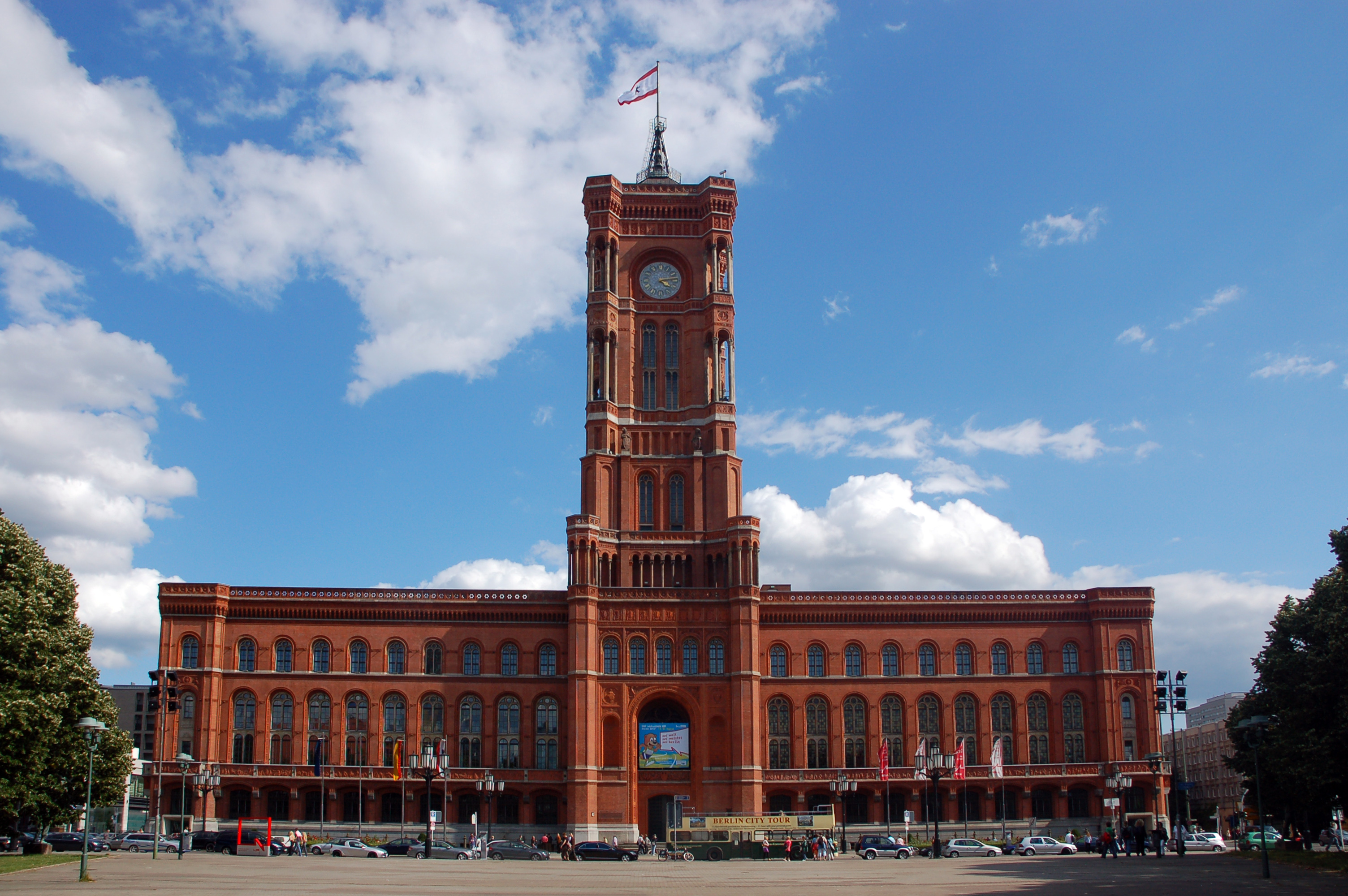
Rotes Rathaus in Berlin, Germany

- Churches of St Columba and St Chad, Haggerston in the East End of London, designed by James Brooks.
- Rotes Rathaus in Berlin, Germany.
- Strangeways Prison in Manchester, England.
- Hillfield House in Gloucester, England, designed by John Giles.
- Mole Antonelliana in Turin, Italy.

== Awards ==
- RIBA Royal Gold Medal – Karl Richard Lepsius.
- Grand Prix de Rome, architecture: Ferdinand Dutert.

== Births ==
- March 21 – Albert Kahn, German-born industrial architect working in the United States (died 1942)
- March 29 – Edwin Lutyens, "the greatest British architect"(died 1944)
- April 4 – Mary Colter, American architect and designer (died 1958)
- April 28 – Bertram Goodhue, American neo-Gothic designer (died 1924)
- August 13 – Tony Garnier, French architect and urban designer (died 1948)
- November 4 – Fritz Schumacher, German architect and urban designer (died 1947)
- November 8 – Adolf Eichler, German architect working in Baku (suicide 1911)
- November 20 – Herbert Tudor Buckland, Welsh-born architect working in Birmingham (died 1951)
- December 7 – Jānis Alksnis, Latvian architect and builder (died 1939)

== Deaths ==
- January 5 – George Smith, English architect and surveyor (born 1782)
- April 13 – Isaiah Rogers, American architect (born 1800)
- July 7 – Horatio Nelson Goulty, English architect (born c.1832)
- August 2 – Luigi Poletti, Italian neoclassical architect (born 1792)
- August 9 – Giuseppe Puini, Italian engineer and neoclassical architect (born 1806)
