= 1857 in architecture =

The year 1857 in architecture involved some significant events.

== Events ==
- September 17 – Official opening of the Municipal Theatre of Santiago, Chile.
- American Institute of Architects (AIA) founded.

== Buildings and structures ==
=== Buildings completed ===
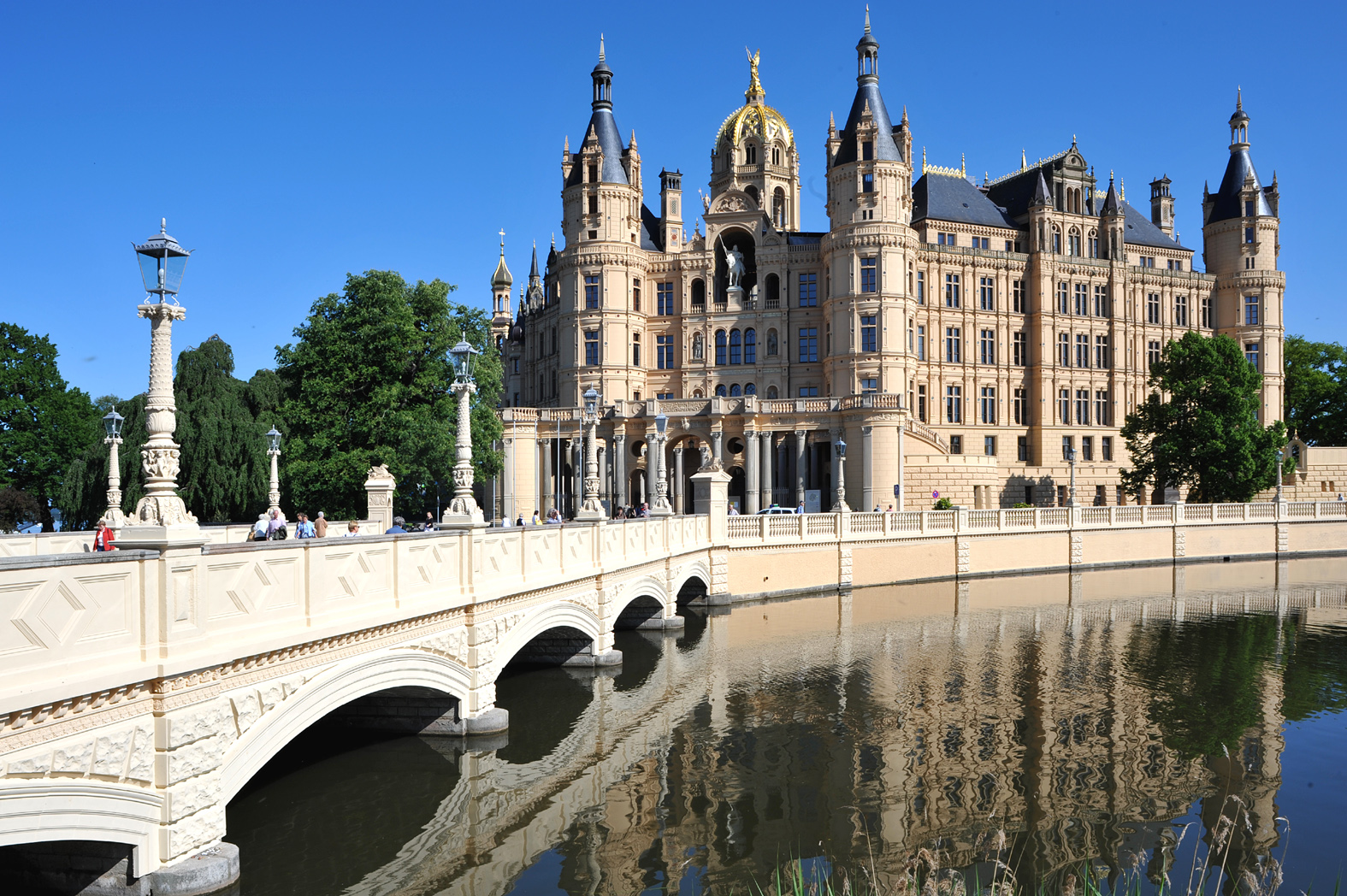
Schwerin Palace

- Absecon Lighthouse in Atlantic City, New Jersey, United States, designed by George Meade.
- Ahırkapı Feneri (lighthouse), Istanbul, Turkey, designed by French engineers.
- Britannia Music Hall, Glasgow, Scotland, designed by Thomas Gildard and H. M. McFarlane.
- Old Town Hall, Silkeborg, Denmark, designed by H. C. Zeltner.
- Schwerin Palace, Mecklenburg, largely designed by Georg Adolf Demmler.
- Borujerdis House, Kashan, Persia, designed by Ustad Ali Maryam.
- Pont Saint-Michel, Paris, France, designed by Paul Gallocher de Lagalisserie and Paul Vaudrey.
- Basilica of Sainte-Clotilde, Paris, France, completed by Théodore Ballu to the design of Franz Christian Gau.
- All Saints' Church, Maidenhead, England, designed and with murals painted by George Edmund Street, with associated school.
- Museum, Trinity College Dublin, Ireland, designed by Thomas Deane and Benjamin Woodward.
- United States Custom House, designed by Ammi B. Young, opens in Providence, Rhode Island
- Zeldenrust, Zuidbarge smock mill, Netherlands.

== Awards ==
- RIBA Royal Gold Medal – Owen Jones.
- Grand Prix de Rome, architecture: Joseph Heim.

== Births ==
- January 18 – William Lethaby, English Arts and Crafts architect and designer (died 1931)
- March 31 – John James Burnet, Scottish architect (died 1938)
- May 28 – Charles Voysey, English Arts and Crafts designer and domestic architect (died 1941)

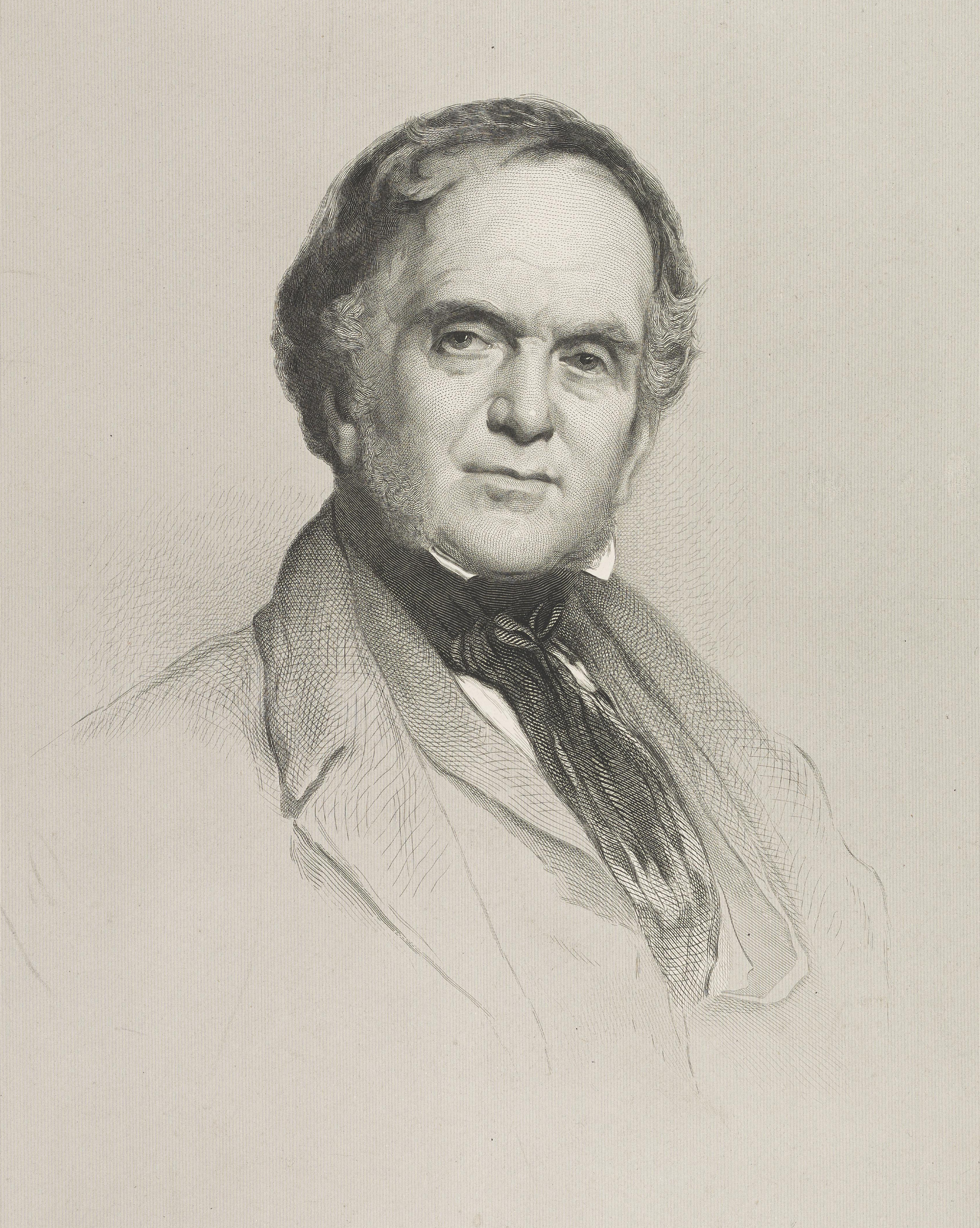
William Henry Playfair

- July 4 – John Campbell, Scottish architect (died 1942)
- August 12 – Marc Camoletti, Swiss architect (died 1940)
- September 1 – W. D. Caröe, English ecclesiastical architect (died 1938)

== Deaths ==
- March 19 – William Henry Playfair, English-born neoclassical architect working in New Town, Edinburgh (born 1790)
- December 9 – Thomas Oliver, English neoclassical architect working in Newcastle upon Tyne (born 1791)
