= 1868 in architecture =

The year 1868 in architecture involved some significant events.

== Events ==
- April 4 – Eduard van der Nüll hangs himself in disappointment at the public reaction to the design of the Vienna State Opera; August Sicard von Sicardsburg, his fellow architect on the project, dies a few months later of tuberculosis before the theatre is opened.
- July 15 – Foundation stone laid for St Colman's Cathedral, Cobh, Ireland, designed by E. W. Pugin and George Ashlin.
- Alfred Waterhouse wins the competition for the design of Manchester Town Hall in England.
- Henry Hobson Richardson is commissioned to build the Alexander Dallas Bache Monument in Washington, D.C., USA.
- The dome of St. Stephen's Basilica in Budapest collapses while under construction.

== Buildings and structures ==
=== Buildings opened ===
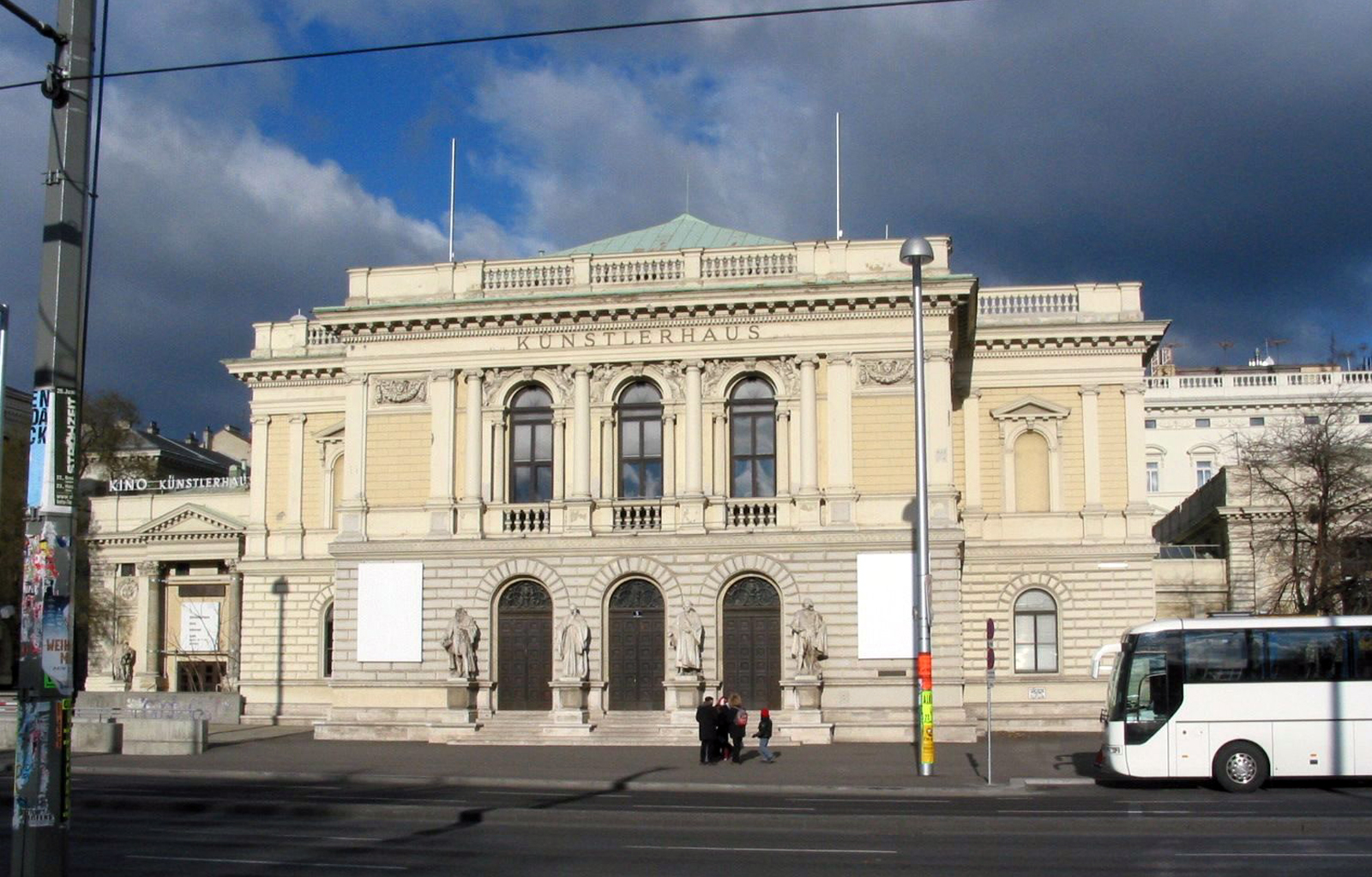
Vienna Künstlerhaus

- January 9 – Pike's Opera House, New York City, USA.
- January 20 – Neues Theater, Leipzig (opera house), Germany.
- August 15 – Teatro Giuseppe Verdi, Busseto, Italy.
- September 1 – Vienna Künstlerhaus (art gallery), Austria, designed by August Weber.
- October 1 – In London, England:
  - St Pancras railway station train shed, designed by W. H. Barlow (construction of the permanent station buildings and Midland Grand Hotel, designed by George Gilbert Scott, has only just begun).
  - Bayswater, Gloucester Road and Notting Hill Gate Underground stations.
- October 10 – Runcorn Railway Bridge, England.
- November 30 – St Andrew's Cathedral, Sydney, Australia, completed by Edmund Blacket.

=== Buildings completed ===
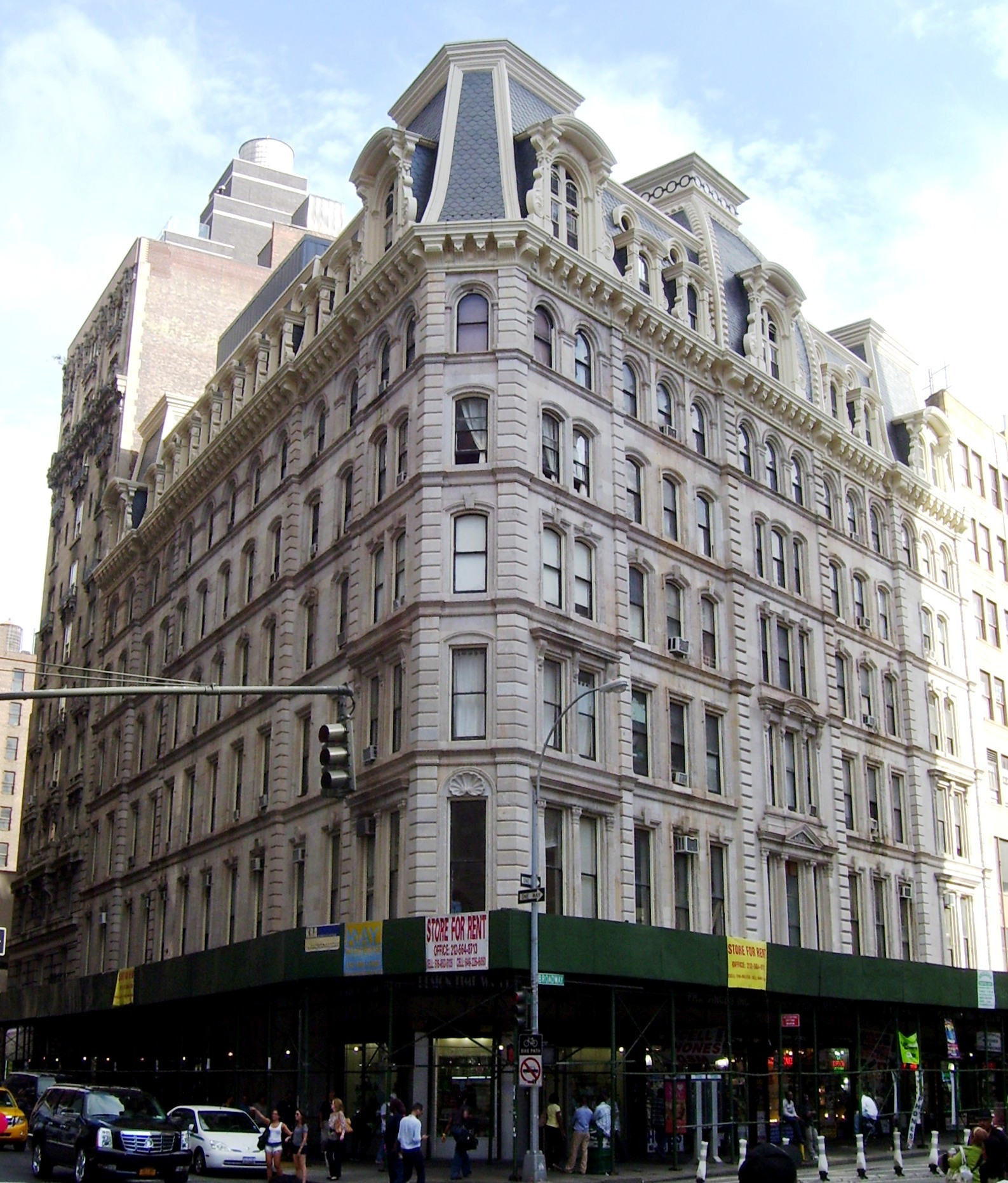
Grand Hotel (New York City)

- Cīrava Palace, Latvia (rebuilt and expanded by Teodor Zeiler).
- The Gyeongbokgung of Korea.
- Hong Kong Hotel.
- Grand Hotel (New York City), USA.
- Gilsey's Apollo Hall (theater), New York City, USA.
- Chamberlin Iron Front Building, Lewisburg, Pennsylvania, USA.
- Halle Saint-Pierre (market), Paris, France
- Royal Hampshire County Hospital, Winchester, England, designed by George Butterfield, advised by Florence Nightingale.
- Abbey Mills Pumping Stations, London, England, designed by engineer Joseph Bazalgette, Edmund Cooper, and architect Charles Driver.
- Ilkeston Town Hall, Derbyshire, England, designed by Richard Charles Sutton.
- Spanish Synagogue (Prague), designed by Vojtěch Ignátz Ullmann.
- Grønland Church, Christiania, Norway, designed by Wilhelm von Hanno.
- Sedgwick House, Cumbria, England, designed by Paley and Austin.
- The Logs, Well Road, Hampstead, London, England designed by J.S. Nightingale.
- Vinegar warehouse for Hill & Evans, 33–35 Eastcheap in the City of London, designed by Robert Lewis Roumieu.

== Awards ==
- RIBA Royal Gold Medal – Austen Henry Layard.
- Grand Prix de Rome, architecture: Alfred Leclerc.

== Births ==
- February 24 – Alfred Brumwell Thomas, English architect (died 1948)
- April 14 – Peter Behrens, German modernist architect and designer (died 1940)
- May 13 – Arthur Anderson, Australian architect (died 1942)
- June 6 – Benedict Williamson, English architect and Catholic priest (died 1948)
- June 7 – Charles Rennie Mackintosh, Scottish architect, designer, watercolourist and artist (died 1928)
- June 8 – Robert Robinson Taylor, first accredited African-American architect (died 1942)

== Deaths ==
- April 4 – Eduard van der Nüll, Viennese architect (born 1812)
- May 23 – James Pigott Pritchett, architect of London and York (born 1789)
- June 11 – August Sicard von Sicardsburg, Austrian architect (born 1813)
- August 3 – Edward Welch, Welsh architect (born 1806)
