= 1872 in architecture =

The year 1872 in architecture involved some significant architectural events and new buildings.

== Events ==
- Work begins on the building of the Church of the Holy Angels, Hoar Cross, Staffordshire, England, designed by George Frederick Bodley and Thomas Garner.

== Buildings and structures ==
=== Buildings opened ===
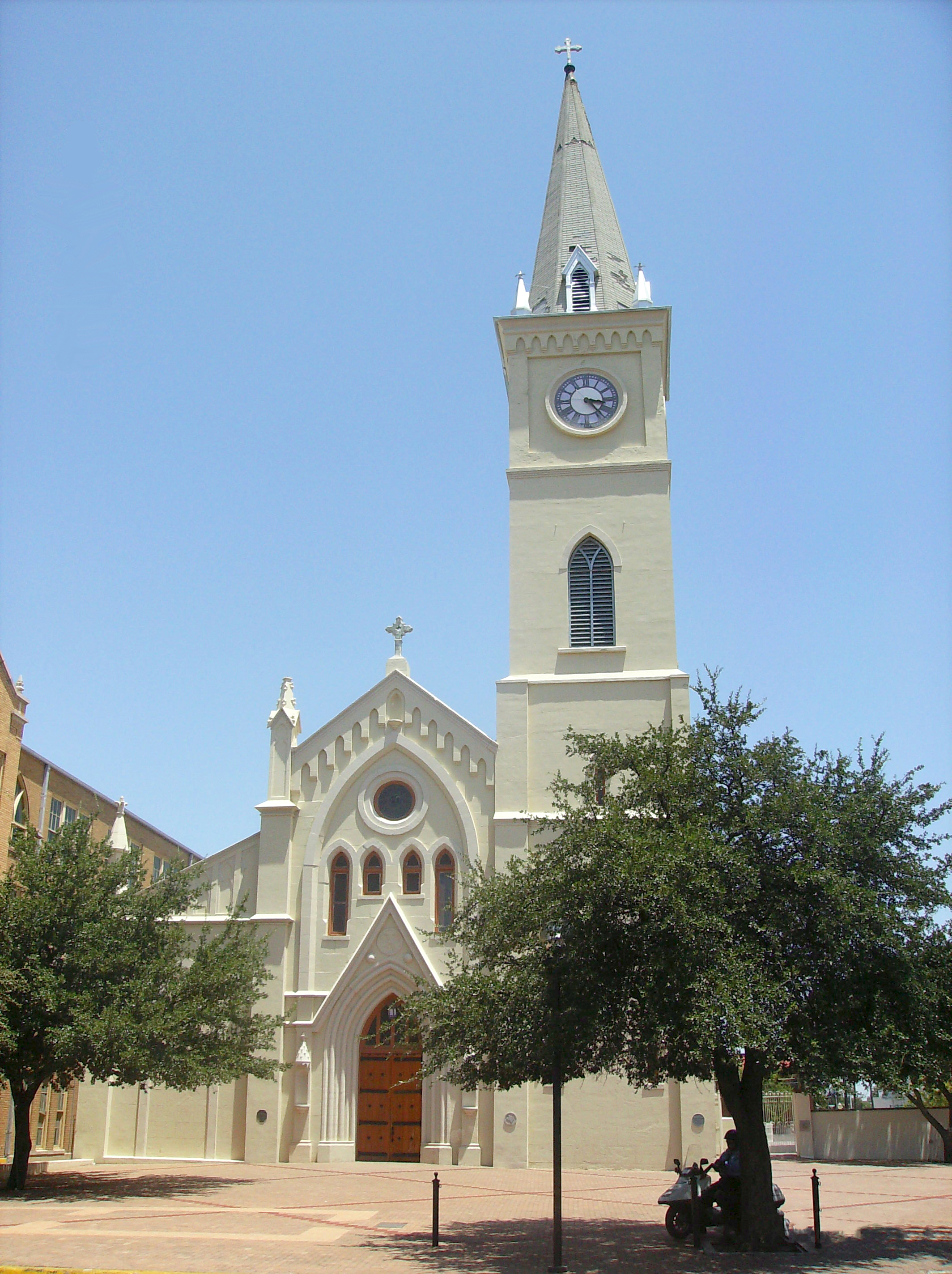
Church of San Agustin, Laredo

- July – The Albert Memorial in London, designed by Sir George Gilbert Scott, is opened by Queen Victoria.
- December 12 – Church of San Agustin, Laredo, Texas, is opened
- The Ancoats Hospital, an enlargement of the existing building, in Manchester, England, designed by Lewis and Crawcroft, begins construction.

=== Buildings completed ===
- Basilica of Our Lady of the Pillar, Zaragoza, Aragon, Spain (nearly two hundred years after it was begun).
- St Mary Magdalene, Paddington, London, designed by George Edmund Street, originally completed.
- St. Matthew's German Evangelical Lutheran Church, Charleston, South Carolina, designed by John Henry Devereux, dedicated.
- The Egyptian Halls, a pioneering iron-framed commercial building in Glasgow designed by Alexander Thomson.
- Palacio Federal Legislativo, Caracas, Venezuela, designed by Luciano Urdaneta.

== Awards ==
- RIBA Royal Gold Medal – Friedrich von Schmidt.
- Grand Prix de Rome, architecture: Louis Bernier.

== Births ==
- January 8 – Antonio Palacios, Spanish architect (died 1945)
- January 20 – Julia Morgan, California-based architect (died 1957)
- January 23 – Jože Plečnik, Slovene architect (died 1957)
- February 9 – Charles Klauder, American architect known for university buildings (died 1938)
- May 26 – Zachary Taylor Davis, Chicago architect (died 1946)
- Clarence Perry, American town planner (died 1944)

== Deaths ==
- January 13 – William Scamp, English architect (born 1801)
- February 20 – Andrew Petrie, builder, architect and Australian pioneer (born 1798)
- June 22 – Frederick Marrable, first Chief Architect of the Metropolitan Board of Works (London) (born 1819)
- December 14 – Robert Richardson Banks, English architect, partner of Charles Barry, Jr. (born 1812)
- December 17 – William Slater, London-based architect (born 1819)
