= 1842 in architecture =

The year 1842 in architecture involved some significant events.

== Buildings and structures ==
=== Buildings ===
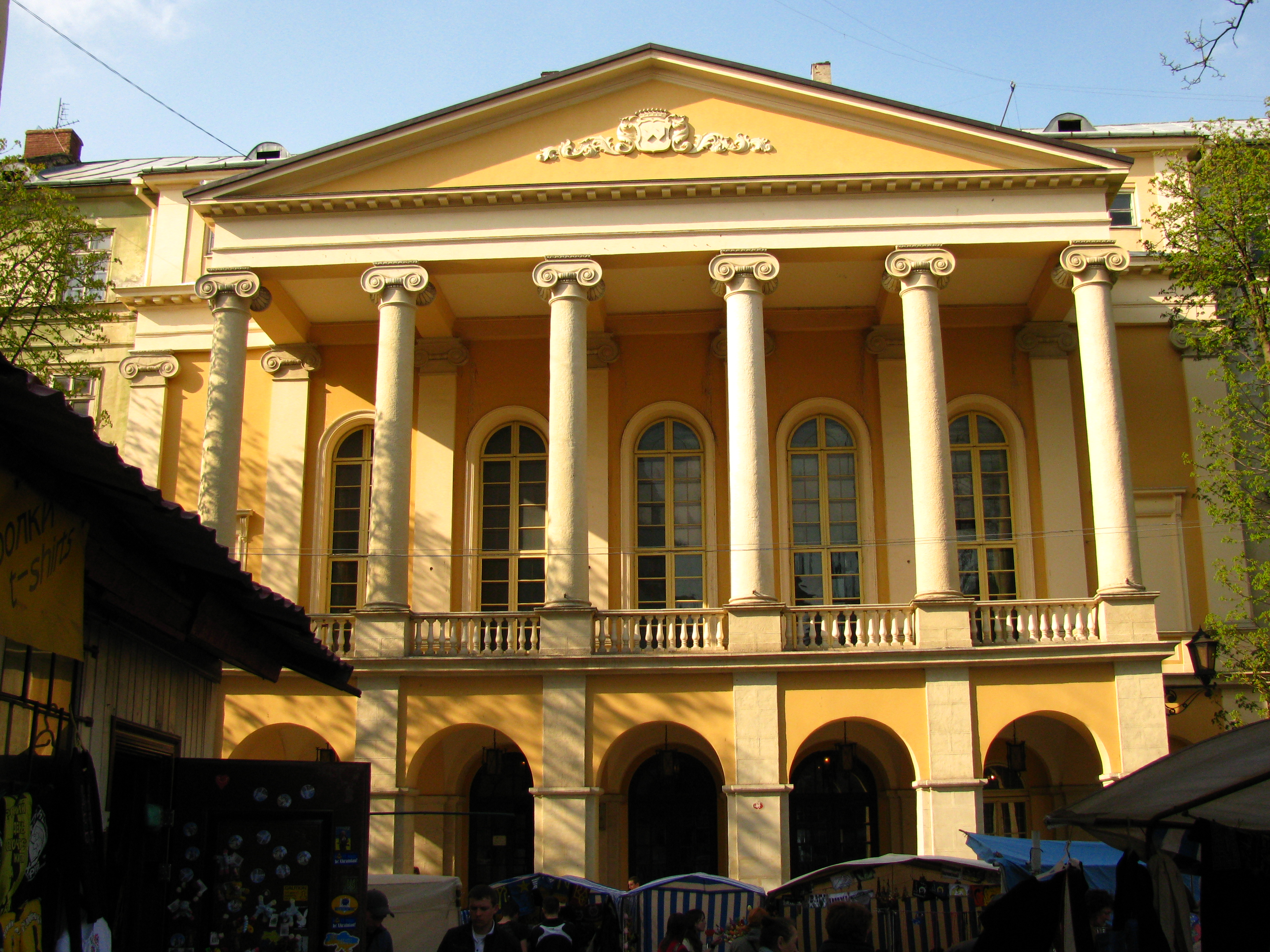
Teatr Skarbkowski, Lviv

- March 28 – The Teatr Skarbkowski in Lviv (Ukraine), designed by Jan Salzmann and Ludwig Pichl, opens.
- June 23 – The Ponte delle Sirenette in Milan, built by Francesco Tettamanzi, is inaugurated.
- October 18 – The Walhalla memorial in Bavaria, designed by Leo von Klenze, is inaugurated.
- Treasury Building (Washington, D.C.), designed by Robert Mills, central and east wings completed,
- Construction of Berry Hill, near Halifax, Virginia starts.
- Iglesia de la Matriz, Valparaíso, Chile, completed.
- Kawaiahaʻo Church, Honolulu, Hawaii, designed by Rev. Hiram Bingham, completed.
- St Mary's Church, Wreay, Cumberland, England, designed by Sara Losh, consecrated.
- Ak Mosque, Tashkent, Uzbekistan, completed.
- Circular church of the Holy Sepulchre, Cambridge, England, restored by Anthony Salvin.
- Cologne Cathedral construction work is recommenced after 400 years by the Central-Dombauverein zu Köln (Central Cathedral Building Society).

== Publications ==
- Andrew Jackson Downing – Cottage Residences

== Awards ==
- Grand Prix de Rome, architecture: Philippe-Auguste Titeux.

== Births ==
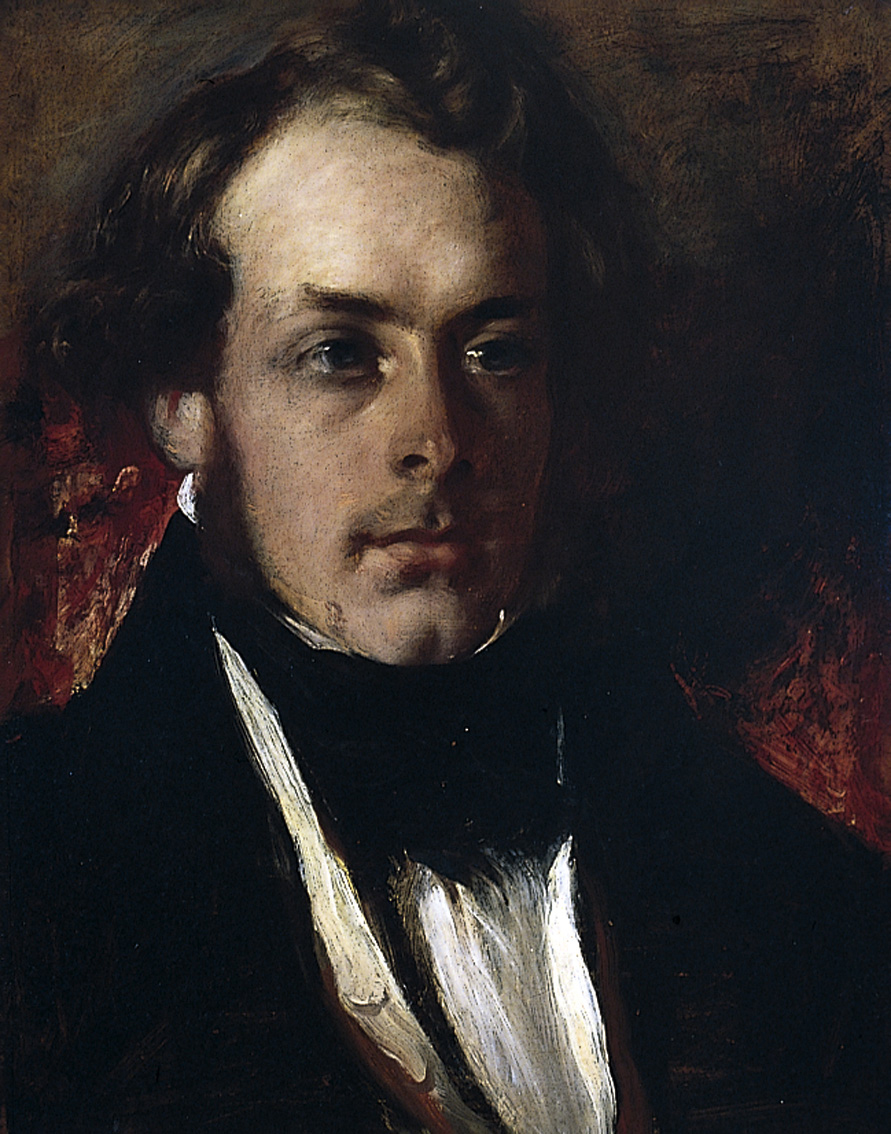
John Harper

- June 12 – Harry Hems, English architectural and ecclesiastical sculptor (died 1916)
- September 17 – Basil Champneys, English architect (died 1935)
- December 12 – Alfred Parland, Russian architect (died 1919)
- December 15 – George Keller, American architect (died 1935)

== Deaths ==
- October 18 – John Harper, English architect (born 1809)
