= John Melvin (architect) =

British architect

John Leonard Melvin (born 31 October 1935) is a British architect, town planner, and author. He is the former chairman of the London Region of the Royal Institute of British Architects (RIBA). His architectural work has been widely exhibited in the UK and abroad by the RIBA and the British Council. In 1993, the Royal Fine Art Commission honoured him with the Building of the Year Award. In 1995, he was named to a Sargant Fellowship at the British School at Rome to research the idea of memory in architecture.

== Personal background ==
Melvin was educated at Sutton Valence School, the Architectural Association School of Architecture, and the Department of Town Planning, University College London. AA Dip. MRIBA, Dip. TP (UCL), MRITPI. He married Julia Rosalind (née Gandy).

== Career ==
After earning a post-graduate diploma in town planning under Sir William Holford, Melvin worked for the London Borough of Islington as the senior architect-planner. At that time, Islington had one of the largest housing programmes in the country and one of the largest concentrations of listed buildings in London.

In 1970, he went into private practice, setting up John Melvin Architects and Town Planners. His most significant work has been in the field of social housing. The housing development in Penton Street 1977 (wide Survey of London) can be seen as a seminal work which won commendations from the Civic Trust and the DoE. The design of the Penton Street flats attempted to link modern functionalism with the 19th century terraced houses of the two adjoining Conservation Areas. Signifiers of home, such as the railings, the door case with its fanlight and stone sills, became a hallmark of John Melvin's work.

In 1975 Melvin and Alison Smithson founded The Architects' Standing Committee for Planning Reform (ASCPR), a pressure group of professionals working in the built environment with the remit to free up excessive government control of city development.

During the 1980s, Andreas Papadakis, director of the leading architectural publishing house, Academy Editions, promoted a series of symposia held at the Tate, the Royal Academy and the Royal Institution. Melvin served as chairman to these events, which had an international profile. As a guest of Papadakis, he edited the House of the Future edition of Architectural Design, and wrote frequently for this magazine.

Penton Street flats were followed by a similar development of housing at Blackstock Road (1981) in London N5. John Melvin's design here is a reflection of the later 19th century villa as found in Highbury. This received awards from the RIBA and the Civic Trust.

In the 1980s, Melvin developed the conservation aspect of his practice with a series of large restoration projects: examples being the transformation of the Royal Agricultural Hall to be the Business Design Centre in Islington 1984–86, the Elizabethan house, Kilbees Farm at Windsor Forest, and Mercers' Place at Brook Green (1986), a residential building for the St Paul's Schools in Hammersmith and Barnes.

The developed housing and a doctor's group practice surgery at Essex Road and Mitchison Road, London N1, for the Mercers' Company. Like his earlier housing schemes, this explored the possibility of reintroducing into modern architecture something of a terrace vernacular. Mercers House received the Worshipful Company of Tylers and Bricklayers Brickwork Award; the Brick Development Association Design Award; and the First Commendation from the Royal Fine Art Commission and Sunday Times Building of the Year Award 1993.

In 1995, Melvin was awarded the Sargant Fellowship at the British School at Rome to research the idea of memory in architecture.

In 1996, the practice moved to Oxfordshire, where in addition to his private client work Melvin received from Wadham College, Oxford, the commission to restore the 18th century Holywell Music Room (2006). For this work of restoration he won an award from the Oxford Preservation Trust.

Melvin was for many years a member of the Bishop of London's Diocesan Advisory Committee for the Care of Churches. For over 10 years he was a member and then Chairman of the Fabric Advisory Committee of Guildford Cathedral.

Melvin's work has been published in the architectural journals. His work has attracted praise from writers including Roger Scruton and Justin Cartwright, both of whom wrote forewords in his books.

== Appointments ==
He was Vice-President of the Architectural Association, of which he was a Council member for many years. He has contributed to the magazine AA Files. In 1974 John Melvin was appointed Chairman of the London Region of the RIBA.

== Exhibitions ==
- 1997: Remembering Rome – The Prince of Wales's Institute of Architecture
- 1999: Eton Observed – Brew House Gallery, Eton
- 2002: Etruscan Places – Architectural Association
- 2003: Etruscan Places – St Andrews University
- 2003: Etruscan Places – Guildford Cathedral
- 2003: Roma – The Stone Gallery
- 2009: Holywell Music Room – Blackwells Oxford
- 2012: Ecco Ercolano – Potenza Picena, Marche

== Honors and awards ==
- Worshipful Company of Tylers and Bricklayers Brickwork Award
- Brick Development Association Design Award
- First Commendation from the Royal Fine Art Commission
- Sunday Times Building of the Year Award 1993

== Published works ==
- Melvin, John (1984). Barnsbury Walk, Royal Institute of British Architects
- Melvin, John (1995). John Melvin: Selected Buildings and Projects, Philip Wilson Publishers, 96 pages. ISBN 978-0302006658
- Melvin, John (1998). Eton Observed, Wysdom Press, 128 pages. ISBN 978-0953329809
- Melvin, John (2008). Whichford and Ascott Observed, Wysdom Press, 64 pages. ISBN 978-0953329816
- Melvin, John (2011). The Stones of Oxford: Conjectures on a Cockleshell, Papadakis Distributing, 96 pages. ISBN 978-1906506131
