= John Sheehy (architect) =

American architect

John P. Sheehy, FAIA, RIBA
- Born: January 19, 1942 (age 84); Hibbing, Minnesota
- Occupation: Architect
- Known for: Mixed-use development

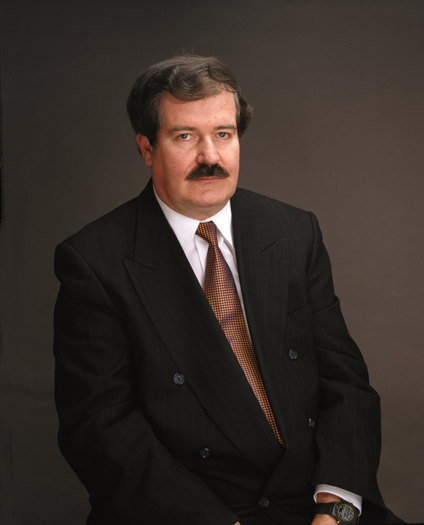
John P. Sheehy, FAIA

John Patrick Sheehy (born January 19, 1942) is an internationally known American architect. He was previously the Chairman of the Board of Principals at the architectural firm The Architects' Collaborative (TAC), working there from 1970 until 1994. He is also a Fellow of the American Institute of Architects and a member of the Royal Institute of British Architects. He is a founding Principal of Architecture International in Mill Valley, California.

Sheehy was born in Hibbing, Minnesota, on the Mesabi Iron Range west of Lake Superior. He received his B.S. in Architecture from the University of Minnesota School of Architecture in 1964, and his Master of Architecture, 1967 from Massachusetts Institute of Technology, Cambridge, Massachusetts.

Sheehy is known for his expertise in the design of Mixed-use development commercial projects, and tall buildings. He was a member of the design team at Skidmore, Owings and Merrill on the 100-story John Hancock Center in Chicago, Illinois and has been the recipient of more than forty architectural design awards, including the 1972 Arthur Rotch Traveling Scholarship.

His significant work as principal at TAC includes: Boston’s Copley Place; 801 Tower, Los Angeles, California; the Johns-Manville World Headquarters, Denver, Colorado; Liberty Center, Pittsburgh, Pennsylvania; and Harvard University’s John F. Kennedy School of Government in Cambridge, Massachusetts.

John Sheehy is currently an associate professor at the School of Architecture at the University of Hawaii in Honolulu. He has also lectured at the Smithsonian Institution, MIT Center for Real Estate, California Polytechnic State University/San Luis Obispo and has been a design critic at the Harvard Graduate School of Design.
