= Simo Paavilainen =

Finnish architect

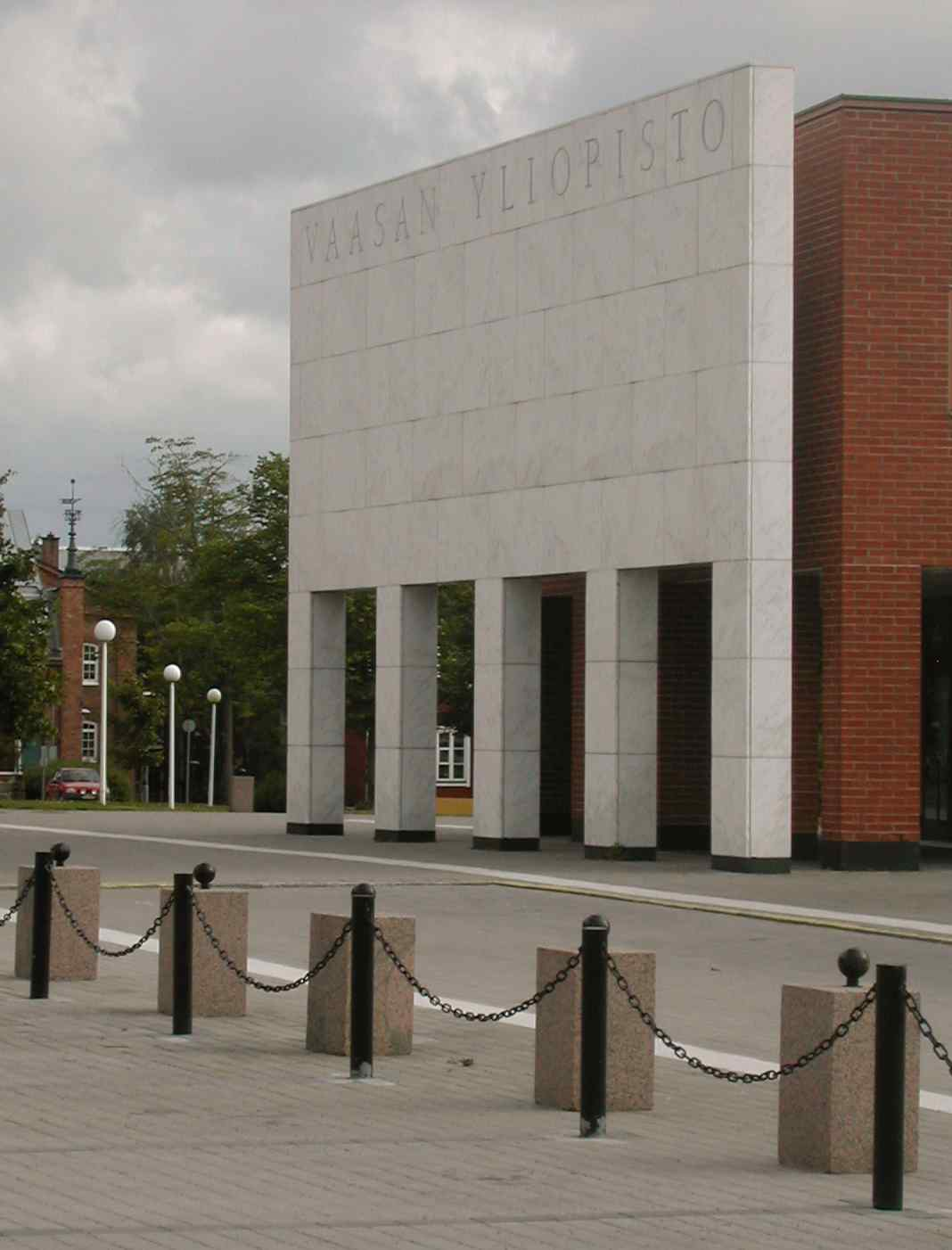
A modern marble arch in front of the main entrance to the University of Vaasa, designed by Simo and Käpy Paavilainen

Simo Paavilainen (born 14 June 1944 in Vaasa) is a Finnish architect, and former Dean and Professor of Architecture at Helsinki University of Technology Department of Architecture.

Paavilainen studied architecture at Helsinki University of Technology, qualifying as an architect in 1975. Since 1977 he has run an architects' office in Helsinki together with his wife Käpy Paavilainen, Arkkitehtuuritoimisto Käpy ja Simo Paavilainen Oy. He was appointed Professor of Architecture at Helsinki University of Technology Department of Architecture in 1998, and dean of the school in 2004. He resigned his position in 2010 to return to private practice.

The work of the Paavilainens first came to attention in the early 1980s, at a time when Finnish critics were adamant that Postmodernism was having no significant influence on architecture in Finland, one of the bastions of Modernist architecture. Against this trend the Paavilainens introduced a strain of playfulness, colour and irony into Modernism. While part of the reasons for their style of architecture is certainly derived from following international trends, this also took on a local concern: in attempting to gain academic respectability, the Postmodern theorists, such as Charles Jencks, Michael Graves and Charles Willard Moore, turned their attention to earlier proto-Postmodernism, one of the prime examples being the architecture in the Nordic countries during the 1920s, Nordic Classicism, and in particular the Swedish architect Gunnar Asplund. Scholars in the Nordic countries became well aware of the international attention, and the architecture of that period, which had been forgotten in the onslaught of Modernism, was then 'rediscovered', as evident in various books and exhibitions. Simo Paavilainen emerged as one of the key academics in the field; but his interest then spilled over into his own architectural production. In more recent years, however, his architecture has moved back towards more traditional Modernism, though again, in the spirit of the times.

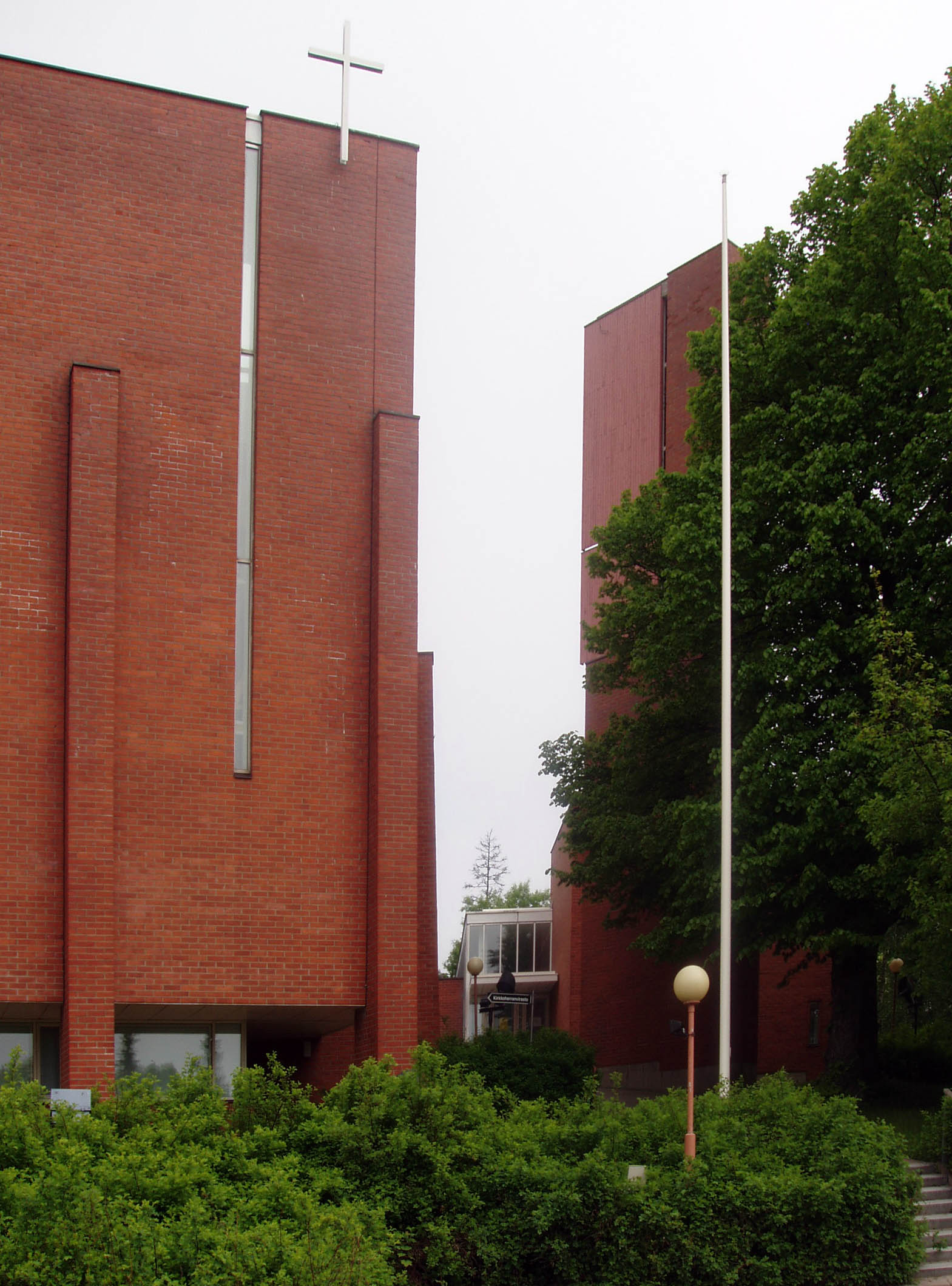
Olari church and parish centre, Espoo, 1981

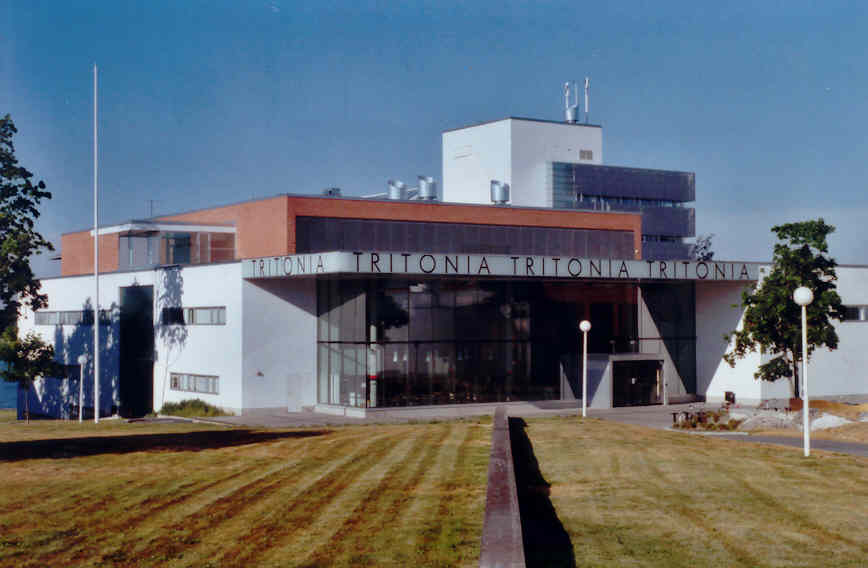
Tritonia Library, University of Vaasa, Stage 1, 1991

== Works ==
- Olari Church and Parish Centre, Espoo, 1976–1981
- Paimio Parish Centre, Paimio, 1980–1984
- St. Michael's Church, Kontula, Helsinki, 1988
- Mansikkala City Offices and Shopping Centre, Imatra, 1990
- University of Vaasa, Stage 1, 1991
- Pirkkala Church and Parish Centre, 1994
- Finnish Embassy, restoration, Tallinn, Estonia, 1996
- Tritonia Library, University of Vaasa, 2001
- Vehkalahti Parish Centre, Hamina, 2002
- Villa Kisko, 2005
- Local Government Pensions Institute, offices, Helsinki, 2005
