= Dick Clark + Associates =

Architect firm based in Austin, Texas

Dick Clark Architecture
- Company type: Limited liability company
- Industry: Architecture
- Founded: 1979
- Headquarters: Austin, Texas, United States
- Owner: Dick Clark (architect)
- Website: www.dcarch.com

Dick Clark + Associates, formerly known as Dick Clark Architecture, LLC is an Austin, Texas-based architectural firm.

The firm, founded in 1979 by Dick Clark III (1944-2017), designs contemporary architecture. Dick Clark Architecture's projects include residential, commercial, educational, and restaurant design and the firm is credited with helping design Austin's visual landscape. They are also involved in the revitalization of Austin's downtown Warehouse District. The firm has earned a number of industry awards.

== Dick Clark ==
Dick Clark III, FAIA (1944 - August 7, 2017) was the principal of the firm. Clark was educated at the University of Texas at Austin School of Architecture and Harvard Graduate School of Design. He practiced architecture in Boston, Knoxville, Managua, Aspen, Copenhagen and throughout Texas. During his 45 years as an architect, Dick designed more than 1,000 projects, including 500 custom or spec homes; fostered more than 20 architectural firms; and won more than 70 awards, including the peer-sponsor and peer-selected title of Fellow from the AIA in 2013. Other projects included commercial buildings, resorts, hotels, retail, multifamily housing, golf facilities. Dick Clark has many award-winning restaurants and entertainment venues in Houston, San Antonio, Dallas and Austin's downtown Warehouse District. With over 30 years of experience in Austin, Dick Clark is well known in the community and had a reputation of creating spaces that are warm, inviting and integral to the city fabric.

Dick Clark was honored with the city's first Downtown Austin Alliance Downtown Impact Award for contributing to the standard of excellence in design.

=== Influences ===
From 1969 to 1971 Clark worked for Bud Oglesby in Dallas, Texas. He was inspired by Oglesby's contemporary style and unique design abilities.

Most recently, Clark served on the advisory board for the University of Texas at Austin, School of Architecture where he participated regularly in Design Review Jury's.

== Gallery ==
Contemporary Residence on Lake Travis Austin, Texas

Contemporary Residence on Lake Travis Austin, Texas

== Awards ==
- 2008, 2007, 2002, 2001, 2000, 1998, 1997, 1996 AIA Honor Award
- 2004 Custom Home Design Award
- 2003 International Interior Design Association Award
- 1999 Downtown Austin Alliance Inaugural Downtown Impact Award
