= 1874 in architecture =

The year 1874 in architecture involved some significant architectural events and new buildings.

== Events ==
- George Devey begins to remodel Ascott House (near Wing, Buckinghamshire) in England.
- Eastern Parkway in Brooklyn, New York, laid out by Frederick Law Olmsted and Calvert Vaux, is completed.
- Watts & Co. established as an interior design and furnishings company in London by George Frederick Bodley, Thomas Garner and George Gilbert Scott Jr.

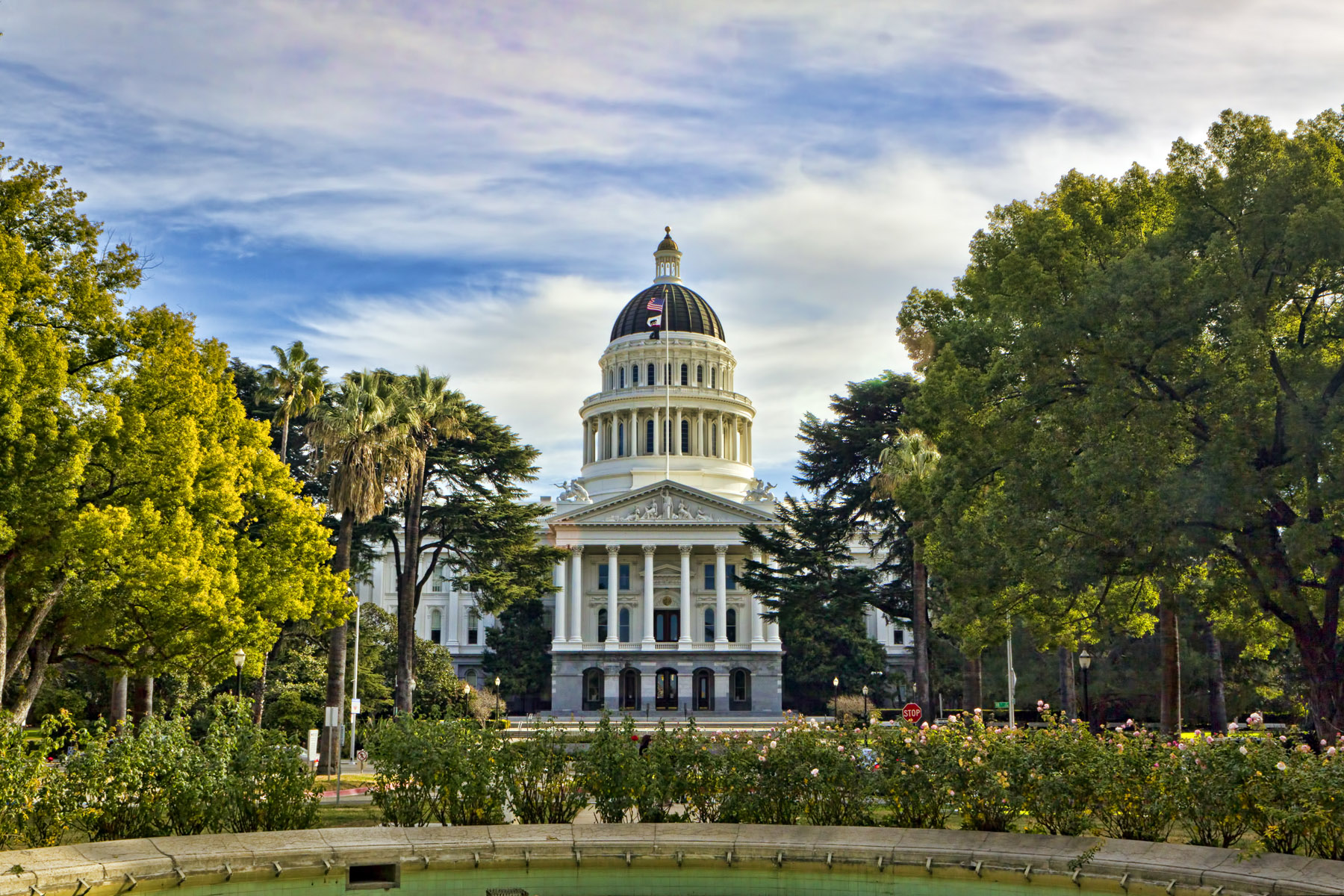
California State Capitol, Sacramento

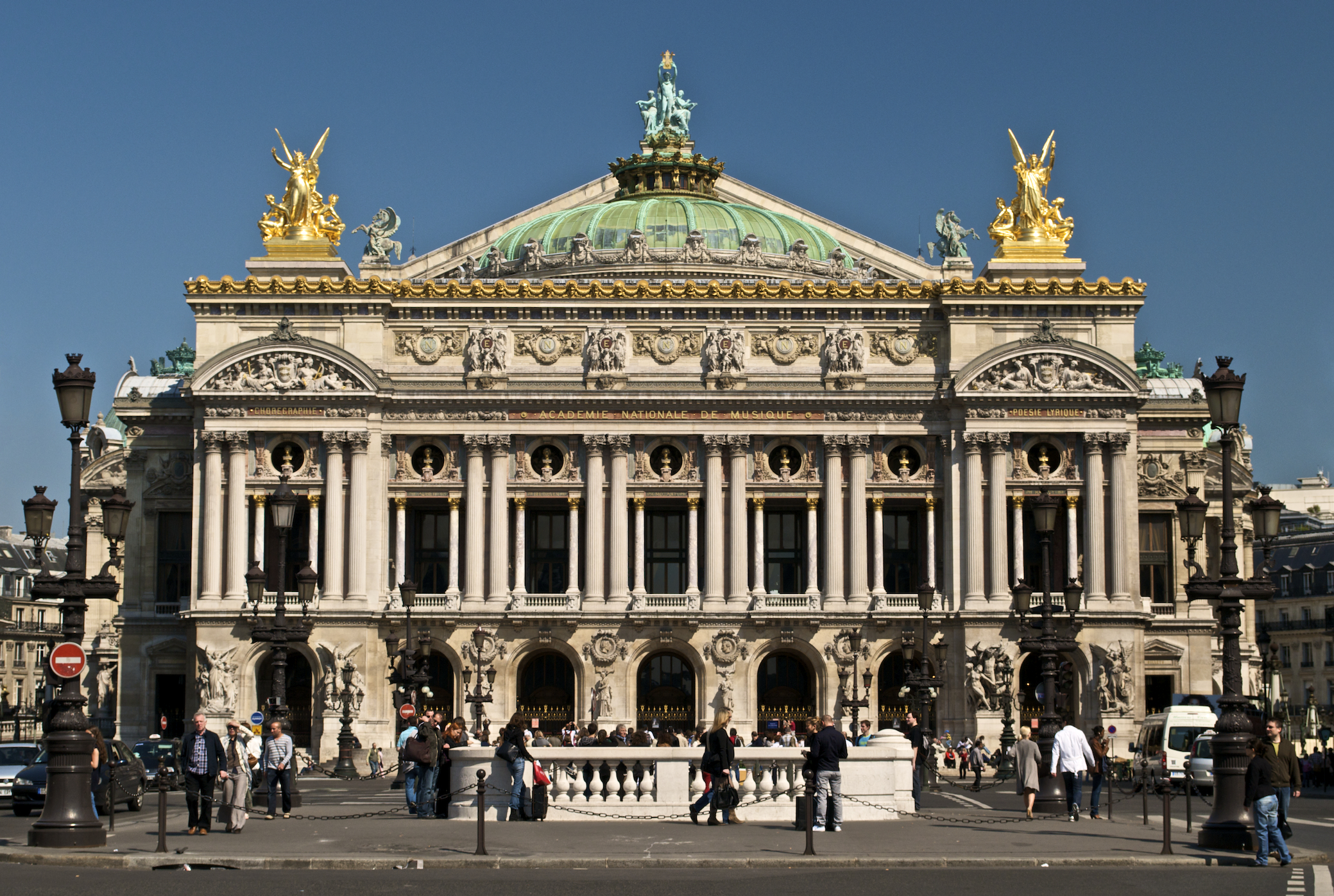
Palais Garnier, Paris

== Buildings and structures ==
=== Buildings completed ===
- California State Capitol in Sacramento, California, USA.
- Eads Bridge at St. Louis, USA, designed by James B. Eads.
- Grand Synagogue of Paris, France, designed by Alfred-Philibert Aldrophe.
- Palais Garnier (opera house), Paris, France, designed by Charles Garnier.
- St. Nicholas' Church, Hamburg, Germany, designed by George Gilbert Scott.
- Wahnfried, Richard Wagner's villa in Bayreuth, Germany.
- The Ancoats Hospital, an enlargement of the current building, in Manchester, designed by Lewis and Crawcroft, opens.
- Serbian Orthodox Cathedral in Sarajevo, designed by Andrey Damyanov

== Awards ==
- RIBA Royal Gold Medal – George Edmund Street.
- Grand Prix de Rome, architecture: Benoît Édouard Loviot.

== Births ==
- February 12 – Auguste Perret, French architect, pioneer of reinforced concrete (died 1954)
- March 10 – Karl Lindahl, Finnish-Swedish architect (died 1930)
- April 11 – William Alexander Harvey, English architect of Bournville (died 1951)
- April 24 – John Russell Pope, American architect (died 1937)
- October 21 – Edwin Cooper, English architect (died 1942)

== Deaths ==
- January 13 – Victor Baltard, French architect (born 1805)
- April 13 – James Bogardus, American inventor and architect (born 1800)
- April 19 – Owen Jones, Anglo-Welsh architect (born 1809)
- August 3 – Carl Tietz, German architect working in Vienna (born 1831)
- September 3 – John Rennie the Younger, English civil engineer (born 1794)
- November 14 – Robert William Billings, British Gothic Revival architectural draughtsman and architect (born 1812)
