= Giuseppe Puini =

Italian engineer and architect

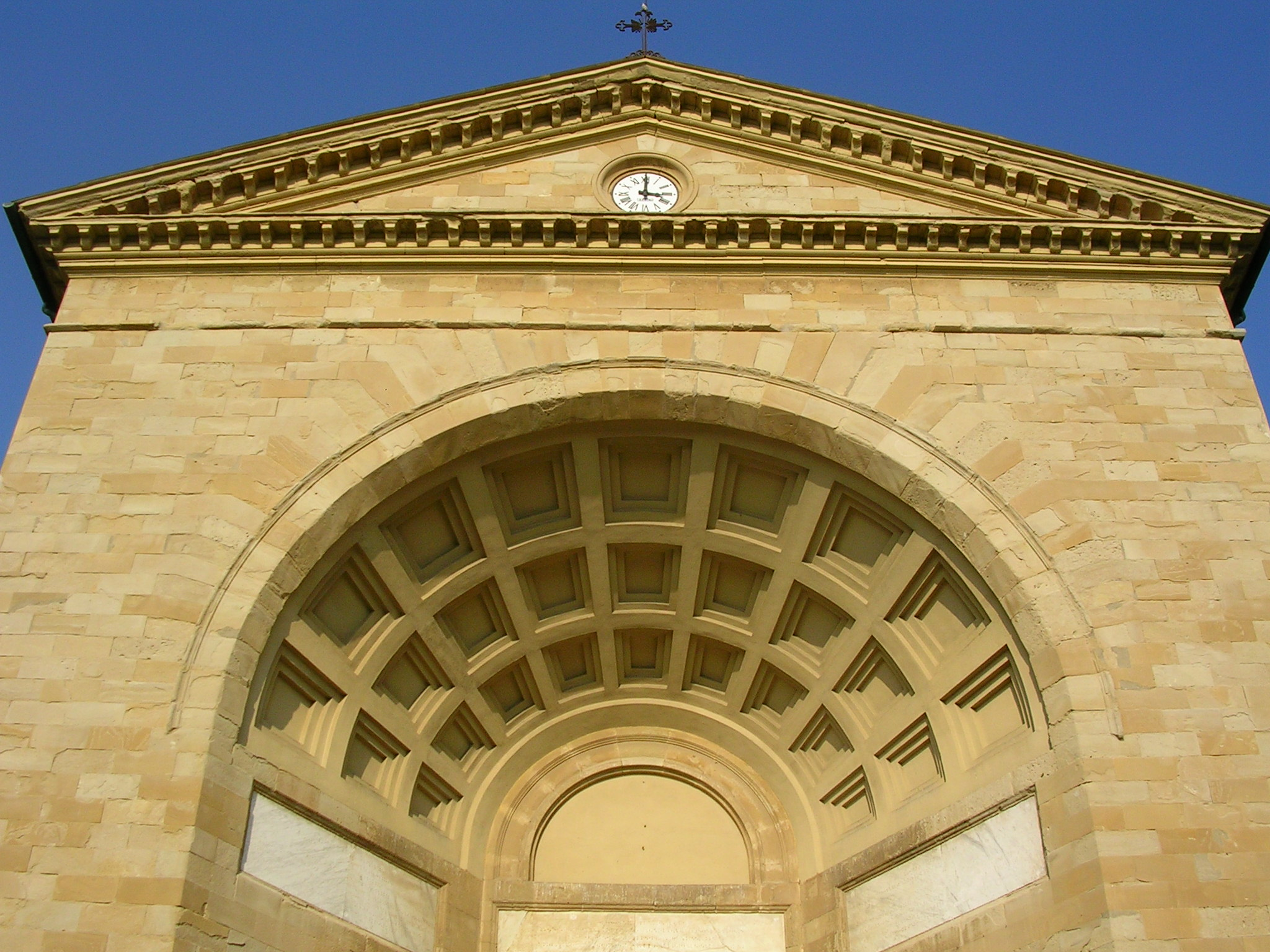
Church of San Giuseppe, Livorno by Puini, facade detail

Giuseppe Puini (21 July 1806 – 9 August 1869) was an Italian engineer and architect who worked in the neoclassical style in Tuscany, largely at Livorno, where he was largely responsible for the piazza that provides an urbanistic setting of the Cisternone (1842) and the Church of Sant’Andrea, and for the Church of San Giuseppe.

== Biography ==
He was born at Regello, near Florence, the son of Valentino Puini. He gained his degree of Master of Architecture at the Accademia di Belle Arti Firenze, 1828. He died in Florence, 1869, and is buried in the Protestant Cemetery, called the "English" cemetery, in Piazzale Donatello.

For Florence, he designed in 1854 the extension of the embankment along the Arno River leading downstream to the Park of the Cascine. He published the designs in Sudi e progetto del Lungarno di Firenze nel punto più interessante alle Cascine, (Florence, 1854). He designed the small tower on the Oltrarno (left) bank at the end of the medieval walls.

His only familiar work in architecture, the church of San Giuseppe, Livorno (detail) was completed in 1839-42. The facade with its trompe-l'œil niche with a coffered barrel vault, refers to the Cisternone nearby.
