= 1948 in architecture =

The year 1948 in architecture involved some significant events.

== Events ==
- Le Modulor by Le Corbusier is published.

== Buildings and structures ==
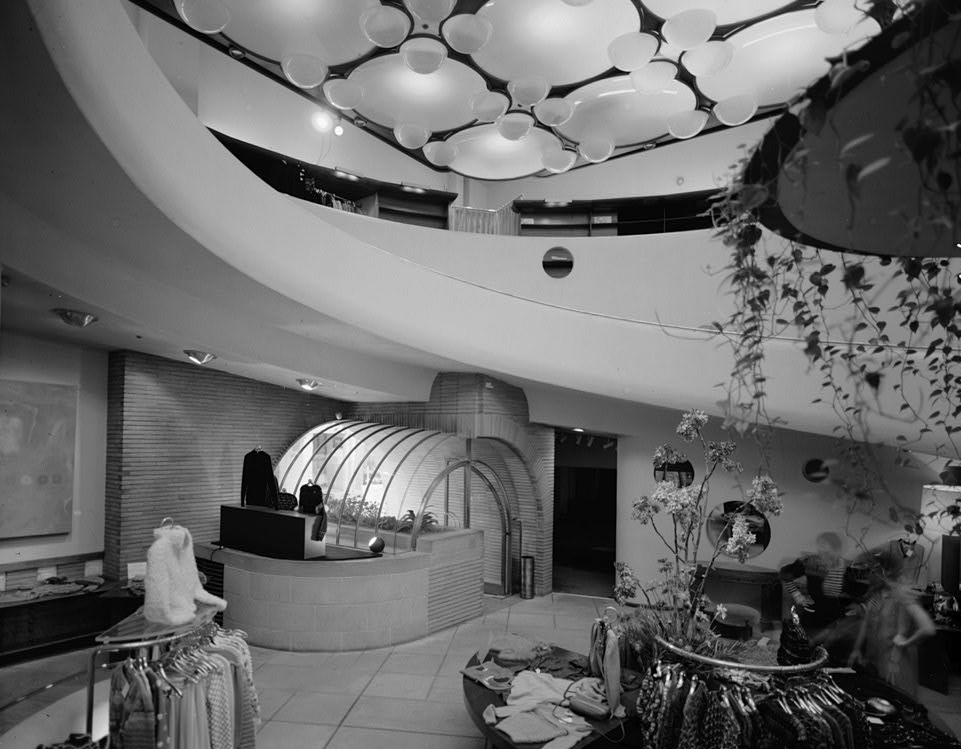
V. C. Morris Gift Shop – Frank Lloyd Wright's prototype for the Guggenheim Museum

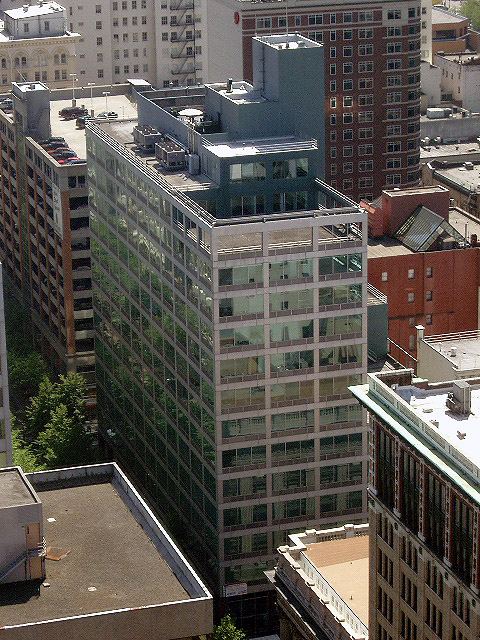
Equitable Building (Portland, Oregon)

=== Buildings ===
- September 10 – The Tripler Army Medical Center in Honolulu, Hawaii, United States is dedicated.
- December – Carswell House in Newark, Delaware, by Edward Durell Stone, completed.
- Mile High Stadium in Denver, Colorado completed.
- V. C. Morris Gift Shop (later, Xanadu Gallery) in San Francisco, by Frank Lloyd Wright.
- Morannedd Café (later, Dylan's), Criccieth Esplanade, Wales, by Clough Williams-Ellis, built (approximate date).
- Mampong Teacher's Training College and Prempeh College, Kumasi, both in Ghana, by Maxwell Fry and Jane Drew.
- Burleigh Primary School, Cheshunt, England, by Mary Crowley, opened.
- Equitable Building (Portland, Oregon), by Pietro Belluschi, completed.
- Holy Family Old Cathedral (Anchorage, Alaska), by Augustine A. Porreca, is completed.
- Calvert Manor apartment building in Arlington, Virginia, by Mihran Mesrobian, built.
- Bachman House in Chicago, remodeling by Bruce Goff, completed.
- Ledbetter House in Norman, Oklahoma, by Bruce Goff, completed.
- Elkay Apartments in Los Angeles, California, by Richard Neutra, built.
- Herman T. Mossberg Residence in South Bend, Indiana, by Frank Lloyd Wright, built.
- Herbert and Katherine Jacobs Second House in Madison, Wisconsin, by Frank Lloyd Wright, completed.
- Jack Lamberson House in Oskaloosa, Iowa, designed by Frank Lloyd Wright, built.
- Haines Shoe House in Hallam, Pennsylvania, built.

== Awards ==
- AIA Gold Medal – Charles Donagh Maginnis
- Olympic gold medal – Adolf Hoch of Austria for Ski jumping hill on the Kobenzl
- Olympic silver medal – Alfred Rinesch of Austria for Watersports centre in Karinthia
- Olympic bronze medal – Nils Olsson of Sweden for Baths and sporting hall in Gothenburg
- RIBA Royal Gold Medal – Auguste Perret

== Births ==
- March 15 – Gavin Stamp, British architectural historian (died 2017)
- October 6 – Ken Yeang, Malaysian ecoarchitect
- December 3 – Maxwell Hutchinson, English architect
- Louis D. Astorino, American architect
- Miguel Cabrera Cabrera, Spanish architect and politician working in the Canaries
- Michael Sorkin, American architect and theorist (died 2020)

== Deaths ==
- January 19
  - Ignjat Fischer, Croatian architect (born 1870)
  - Tony Garnier, French architect (born 1869)
- January 22 – Sir Alfred Brumwell Thomas, English architect (born 1868)
- February 2 – Sir Charles Herbert Reilly, English architect and teacher (born 1874)
- March 29 – Olev Siinmaa, Estonian-Swedish architect (born 1881)
- June 16 – Horace Field, English architect (born 1861)
- August 1 – George Skipper, English architect (born 1856)
- August 20 – Emery Roth, Hungarian-born American architect (born 1871)
- September 3 – Frank Mills Andrews, American architect (born 1867)
- October – Benedict Williamson, English-born architect and Roman Catholic priest (born 1868)
- October 1 – Adolf Szyszko-Bohusz, Polish architect (born 1883)
- October 27 – Albert Randolph Ross, American architect (born 1868)
- John Robert Dillon, American architect
