= 1949 in architecture =

The year 1949 in architecture involved some significant events.

== Events ==
- January 26 – Fire breaks out in the golden hall of Horyu-ji Buddhist temple, Japan, causing severe damage to the building, mainly its first floor, and murals. As a result of the restoration (completed in 1954) it is estimated that about 15–20% of the original seventh century Kondo materials is left in the building; the charred timbers are carefully removed to a separate fireproof warehouse for future research.
- George Pace is appointed surveyor to the Church of England Diocese of Sheffield and establishes a private practice in York.

== Buildings and structures ==
=== Buildings opened ===
- Early – Spa Green Estate in London, designed by Berthold Lubetkin of the Tecton Group with Ove Arup & Partners.
- August 20 – Las Lajas Shrine in Colombia, begun in 1916.
- December 16 – The Voortrekker Monument in Pretoria, designed by Gerard Moerdijk.

=== Buildings completed ===
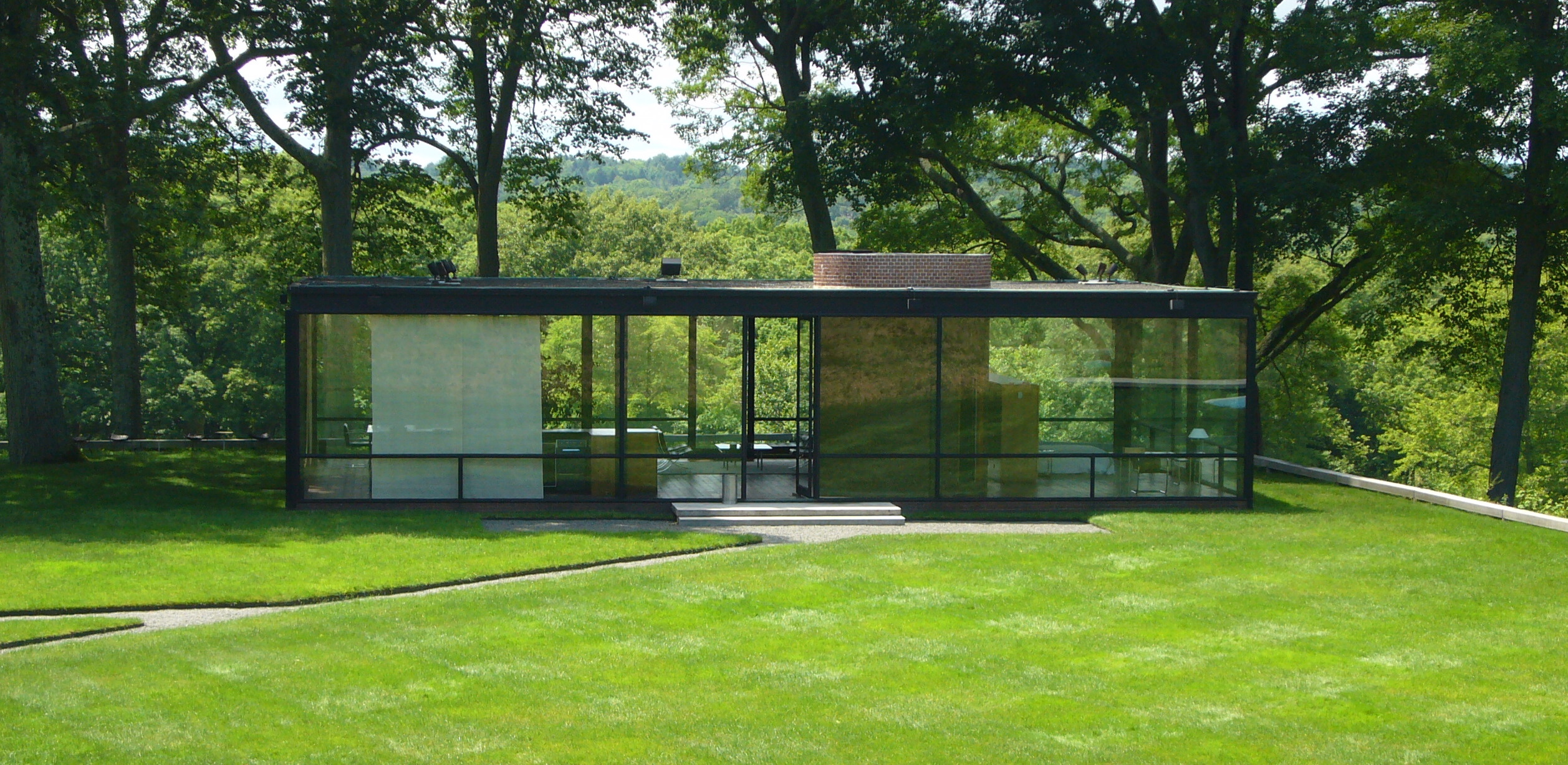
Philip Johnson's Glass House

- Ford House in Illinois designed by Bruce Goff.
- Glass House in New Canaan, Connecticut designed by Philip Johnson.
- Eames House in Los Angeles, California, designed by Charles Eames.
- Promontory Apartments in Chicago, Illinois, designed by Ludwig Mies van der Rohe.
- Church of Saint Francis Xavier, Kansas City, Missouri, designed by Barry Byrne.
- Googies coffee shop, West Hollywood, California, designed by John Lautner.

== Awards ==
- American Academy of Arts and Letters Gold Medal – Frederick Law Olmsted.
- AIA Gold Medal – Frank Lloyd Wright.
- RIBA Royal Gold Medal – Howard Robertson.

== Births ==
- January 4 – Peter Blundell Jones, British architectural historian (died 2016)
- June 14 – Bořek Šípek, Czech neo-baroque architect and designer (died 2016)
- August 26 – Dan Cruickshank, British architectural historian
- December 9 – Tom Kite, American professional golfer and golf course architect
- Demetri Porphyrios, Greek New Classical architect

== Deaths ==
- March 1 – Gordon Kaufmann, English-born American architect known for his work on the Hoover Dam (born 1888)
- March 4 – Sir Charles Nicholson, 2nd Baronet, English ecclesiastical architect (born 1867)
- April 17 – R. Harold Zook, American architect working in Chicago (born 1889)
- May 1 – Josep Maria Jujol, Catalan architect (born 1879)
- September 27 – David Adler, American architect (born 1882)
