= 1946 in architecture =

The year 1946 in architecture involved some significant architectural events and new buildings.

== Events ==
- J. M. Richards publishes his anatomy of England's suburbia, The Castles on the Ground, illustrated by John Piper.
- Thomas Sharp publishes The Anatomy of the Village.

== Buildings and structures ==
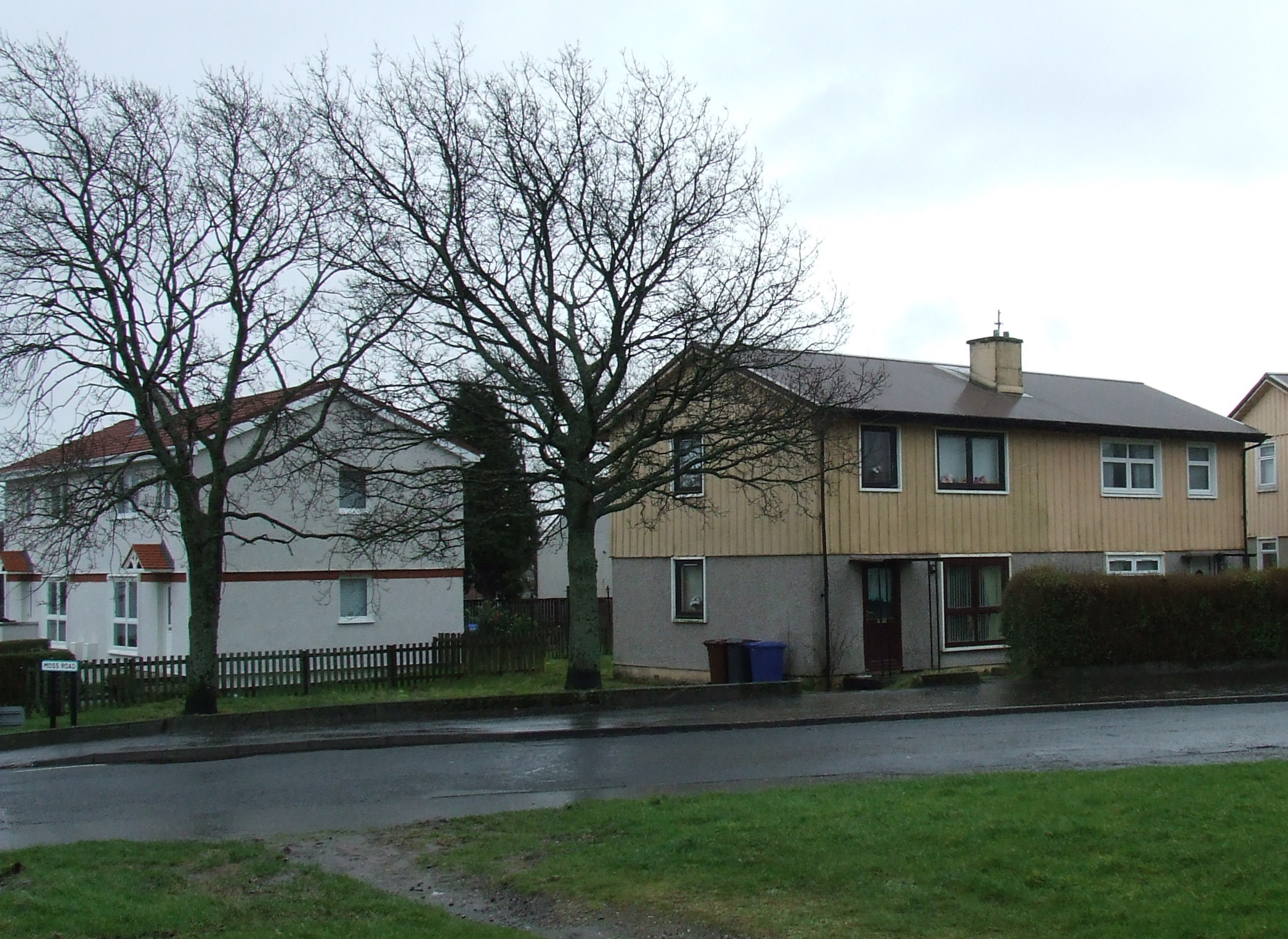
Original (right) and reconstructed (left) BISF houses in Port Glasgow

=== Buildings ===
- Hudson's department store in Detroit, Michigan, United States is completed.
- BISF houses in the United Kingdom, designed by Frederick Gibberd.
- KPRK radio station building in Livingston, MT is designed and built.

== Awards ==
- RIBA Royal Gold Medal – Patrick Abercrombie.
- Grand Prix de Rome, architecture – Guillaume Gillet.

== Births ==
- April 24 – Piers Gough, English architect
- May 12 – Daniel Libeskind, Polish architect, artist and set designer
- May 13 – Basil Al Bayati, Iraqi architect and designer
- date unknown
  - Alberto Campo Baeza, Spanish architect
  - Richard Johnson, Australian architect

== Deaths ==
- February 4 – Herbert Baker, British architect based in South Africa (born 1862)
- August 30 – Theodate Pope Riddle, American architect (born 1867)
- December 16 – Zachary Taylor Davis, Chicago-based U.S. architect (born 1872)
