= 1951 in architecture =

The year 1951 in architecture involved some significant events.

== Buildings and structures ==
=== Buildings ===
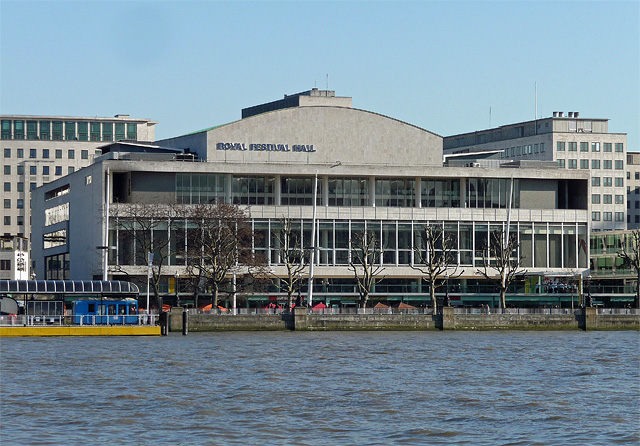
Royal Festival Hall in London, England

- January 2 – Federal Reserve Bank Building (Seattle), designed by William J. Bain of NBBJ, opened.
- February 19 – Mount Sinai Hospital (Minneapolis), designed by Liebenberg and Kaplan, opens.
- February 28 – Bronx River Houses completed in the Soundview section of The Bronx in New York City.
- May 3 – Festival of Britain opened in London:
  - Royal Festival Hall, designed by Leslie Martin, Peter Moro and Robert Matthew.
  - Dome of Discovery, designed by Ralph Tubbs.
  - Skylon, designed by Philip Powell, Hidalgo Moya and Felix Samuely.
  - Telecinema, designed by Wells Coates.
  - Riverside Restaurant, New Schools building and Waterloo entrance tower, designed by Jane Drew with Maxwell Fry.
  - The Land of Britain and The People of Britain pavilions, the Turntable Café and the "Concourse" promenade, designed by H. T. Cadbury-Brown.
  - Fountain by Eduardo Paolozzi.
  - '51 Bar by Leonard Manasseh and Ian Baker.
  - The bombed St John's Church, Waterloo, remodelled by Thomas Ford, is rededicated as the Festival church.
  - The Lansbury Estate in Poplar is begun as a housing showcase – including Trinity Congregational Church, designed by Cecil Handyside and Douglas Stark.
- May 23 – Terrace Theatre (Minnesota), designed by Liebenberg and Kaplan, opens.
- 860-880 Lake Shore Drive Apartments are completed in Chicago, by Ludwig Mies van der Rohe.
- Healy Guest House, Siesta Key, Florida, designed by Paul Rudolph and Ralph Twitchell is completed.
- The JK Building completed in Belo Horizonte, Brazil as designed by Oscar Niemeyer.
- Farnsworth House (Plano, Illinois) is completed by Ludwig Mies van der Rohe.

== Events ==
- The antenna of the Empire State Building in New York City is added to the building.
- Nikolaus Pevsner publishes the first in his Buildings of England series for Penguin Books, the volume on Nottinghamshire.
- Norman Jewson publishes his autobiographical By Chance I did Rove.

== Awards ==
- AIA Gold Medal – Bernard Ralph Maybeck.
- RIBA Royal Gold Medal – Vincent Harris.
- Grand Prix de Rome, architecture – Louis de Hoÿm de Marien.

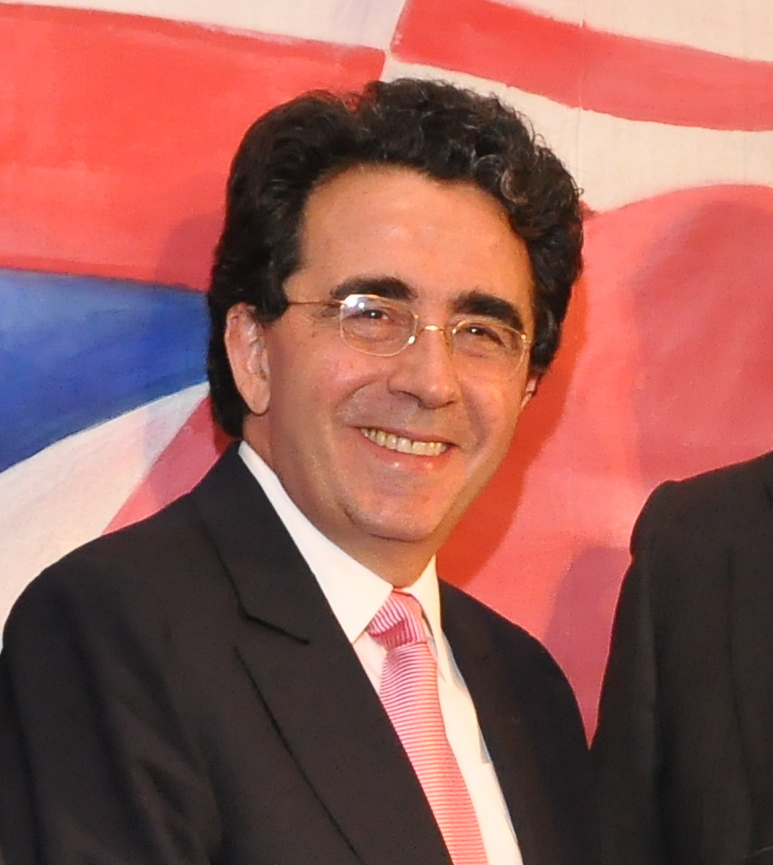
Santiago Calatrava

== Births ==
- July 28 – Santiago Calatrava, Spanish architect and structural engineer
- Suad Amiry, Palestinian architect and author
- Yvonne Farrell, Irish architect

== Deaths ==
- February 6 – William Alexander Harvey, English architect working in Birmingham (born 1874)
- July 22 – Arthur Joseph Davis, English architect (born 1878)
- Herbert Tudor Buckland, British architect working in Birmingham (born 1869)
