= 1943 in architecture =

The year 1943 in architecture involved some significant architectural events and new buildings.

== Events ==
- The Athens Charter is published by the Congres Internationaux d'Architecture Moderne group of architects.
- Nikolaus Pevsner's book An Outline of European Architecture is published in Britain.
- The County of London Plan is prepared by J. H. Forshaw and Patrick Abercrombie.

== Buildings and structures ==
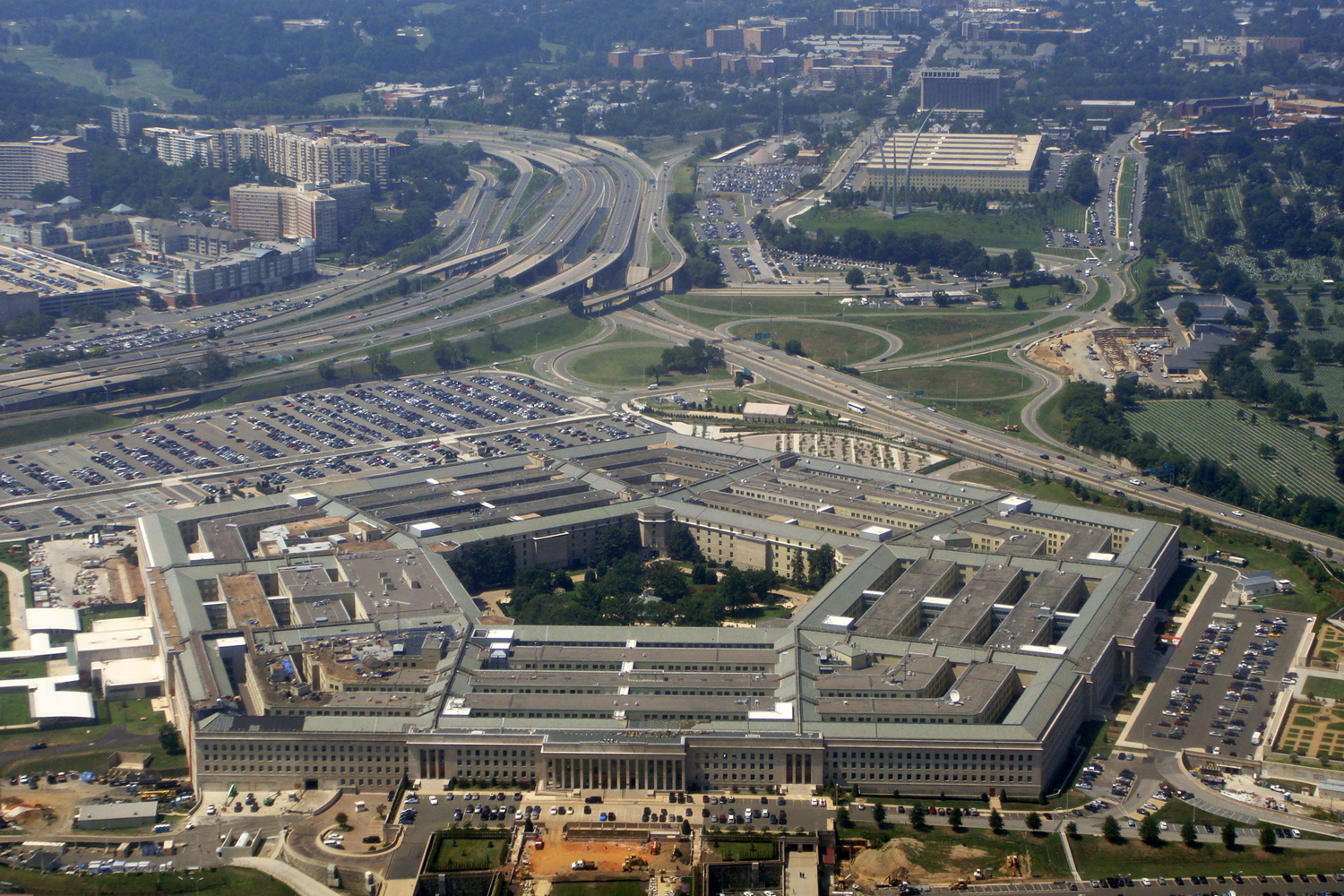
The Pentagon

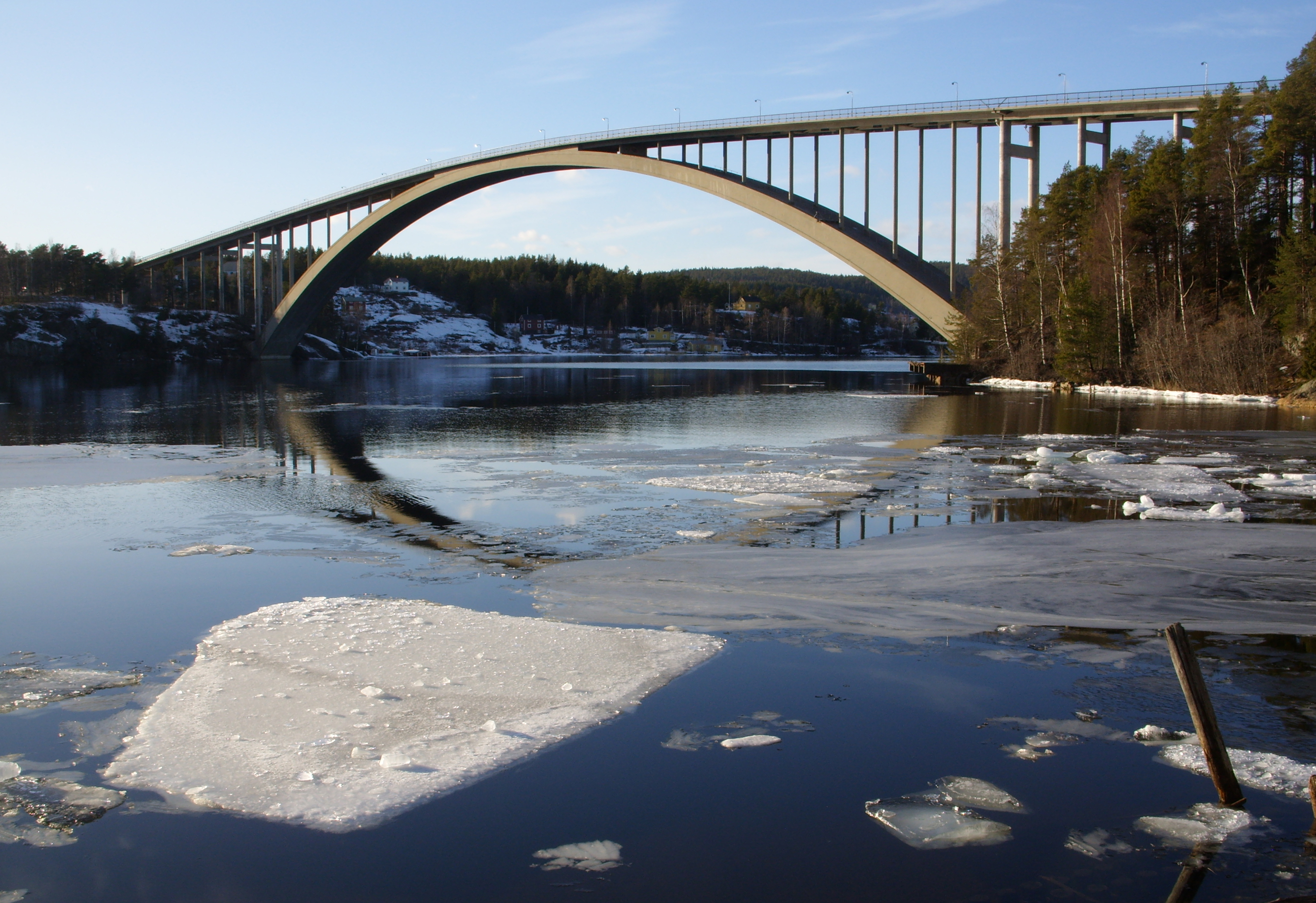
Sandö Bridge

=== Buildings opened ===
- January 15 – The Pentagon in Washington, D.C., United States, designed by George Bergstrom
- April 13 – The Jefferson Memorial in Washington D.C., designed by John Russell Pope
- Peace River Suspension Bridge, Canada (collapsed 1957)
- Sandö Bridge, Sweden
- Surp Hagop Church, Aleppo, Syria
- Church of Saint Francis of Assisi, Pampulha, Belo Horizonte, Minas Gerais, Brazil, designed by Oscar Niemeyer
- Umaid Bhawan Palace, Jodhpur, India, designed by Henry Vaughan Lanchester (begun 1929)
- Block D, Bletchley Park, England.

=== Buildings completed ===
- Casa Malaparte on Capri, house for Curzio Malaparte designed by him with Adalberto Libera and builder Adolfo Amitrano (begun 1937)

== Awards ==
- RIBA Royal Gold Medal – Charles Herbert Reilly.
- Grand Prix de Rome, architecture: André Chatelin and Jean Dubuisson.

== Births ==
- January 3 – Sigrid Lorenzen Rupp, German-born architect (died 2004)
- March 14 – Peter Vetsch, Swiss architect
- April 1 – Mario Botta, Swiss architect
- April 24 – Franco Stella, Italian architect
- April 26 – Peter Zumthor, Swiss architect
- August 7 – Abdel-Wahed El-Wakil, Egyptian architect working in Islamic and New Classical styles

== Deaths ==
- June 27 – Knud Arne Petersen, Danish architect and director of Tivoli Gardens, Copenhagen (born 1862)
- July 19 – Giuseppe Terragni, Italian Rationalist architect (born 1904; thrombosis)
- November 29 – John Virginius Bennes, Oregon architect (born 1867)
