= List of pagodas in Beijing =

This list of pagodas in Beijing comprises all Buddhist and Taoist pagodas erected within Beijing Municipality, an area which covers the city of Beijing as well as its surrounding districts and counties. The list includes some important pagodas that are no longer standing.

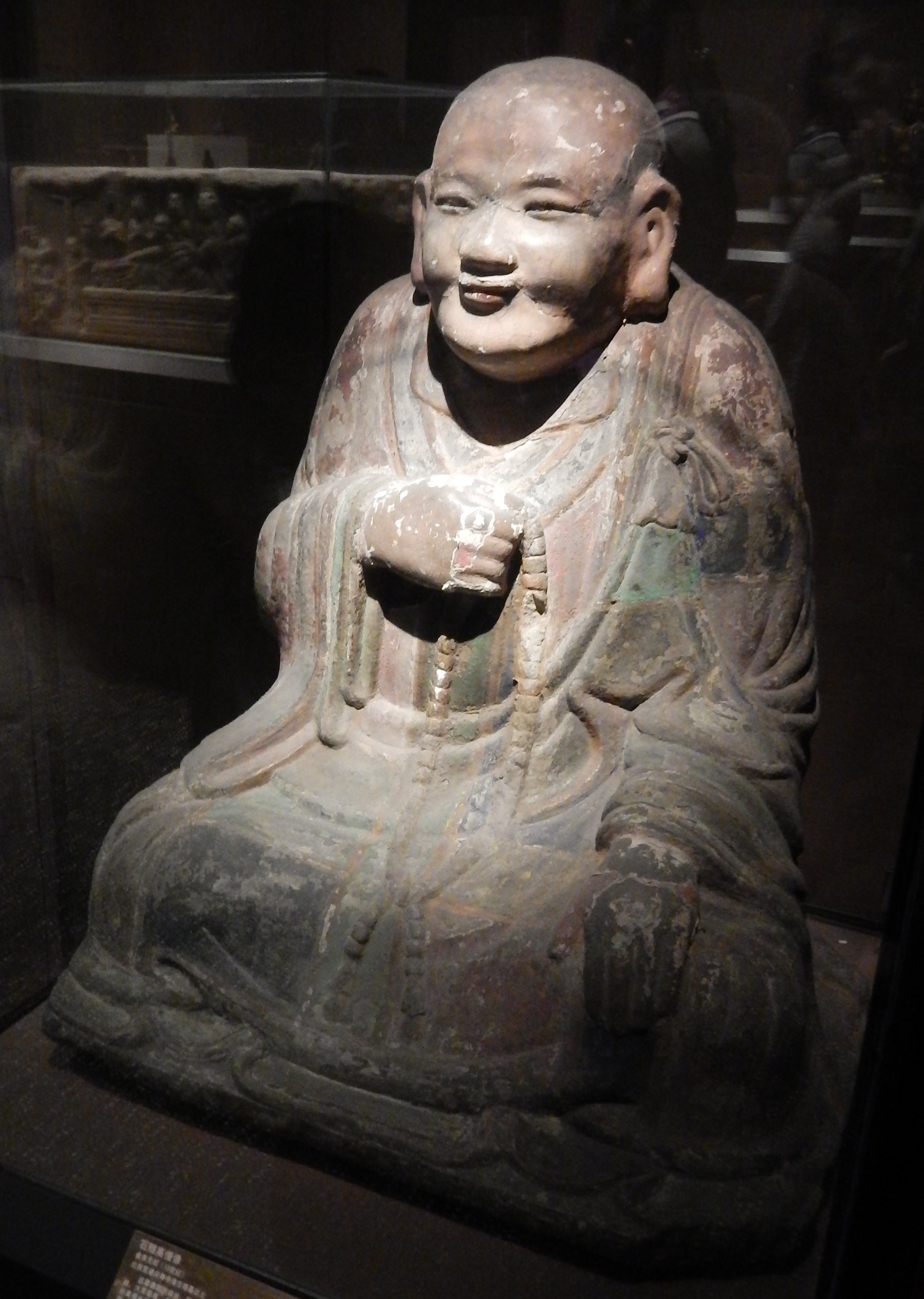
Statue of the monk Haiyun 海雲 (1203–1257), found in the underground hall of the Haiyun Pagoda of Qingshou Temple when it was demolished in 1954; the statue is now at the Capital Museum.

Pagodas have been erected in the city of Beijing since at least the Sui dynasty (581–618). Many large-scale pagodas were erected during the Liao dynasty (907–1125), when Beijing was one of the four secondary capitals established by the Khitans. Most of the pagodas built during the Liao dynasty are octagonal, solid pagodas made out of brick and stone, with multiple tiers of closely spaced eaves. Important examples of Liao pagodas in Beijing include the Tiankai pagoda (erected c.1110), the Yunju pagoda (erected c. 1118). and the Tianning pagoda (erected c. 1120). The latter pagoda is the oldest surviving major building in the city of Beijing.

Beijing was promoted to be the principal capital of the Jurchen Jin dynasty (1115–1234) in 1153. The Jin capital was destroyed by the Mongols, under Genghis Khan, in 1215, and no pagodas dating from this period survive within the city of Beijing. However, a group of five pagodas erected within a temple at Silver Mountain (銀山) near Beijing is still standing.

During the Yuan dynasty (1271–1368), Beijing was for the first time the capital of all China, and under the auspices of Kublai Khan the city (known as Khanbaliq in Mongolian or Dadu in Chinese) was rebuilt on a grander scale. Pagodas constructed during the Yuan dynasty include traditional Liao-style multi-eaved pagodas, such as the twin pagodas of Qingshou Temple (demolished in 1954). In addition, as the Mongolian rulers of the Yuan dynasty were patrons of Tibetan Buddhism, this period saw the introduction of a new Tibetan style pagoda, painted white and in the shape of a stupa (or an inverted monk's begging bowl), often referred to as a dagoba. The fine example of a white dagoba at Miaoying Temple was commissioned by Kublai Khan in 1271, and constructed under the supervision of the Nepali architect Araniko (Arginer). An unusual "straddling the street pagoda", consisting of an arch surmounted by three white dagobas was built by command of the last Yuan emperor, Toghon Temür, in 1342–1345, although now only the arch base is still standing.

Beijing continued as the capital of China during most of the Ming dynasty (1368–1644). A fine example of a Ming dynasty pagoda is the Pagoda of Cishou Temple, built in 1576 by the Wanli Emperor for the Empress Dowager Li, which is modelled on the Liao dynasty pagoda at Tianning Temple.

Beijing was the capital of China throughout the Qing dynasty (1644–1911). Like the Mongolians during the Yuan dynasty, the Manchu rulers of the Qing dynasty were patrons of Tibetan Buddhism, and so the Qing dynasty saw the erection of further examples of Tibetan-style white dagobas, including examples at Dajue Temple and on an island in Beihai Park. Other examples of pagodas from this period include the Duobao Glazed Pagoda in the Summer Palace, which is covered in glazed statuettes of buddhas.

During the 20th century, some pagodas in Beijing were destroyed by war, particularly during the Second Sino-Japanese War (1937–1945). After the founding of the People's Republic of China in 1949, a new era of modernization threatened the survival of many ancient buildings and structures in Beijing. Despite the vocal protests of the architect Liang Sicheng, a pair of famous pagodas in the centre of the city (the twin pagodas of Qingshou Temple), built during the Yuan dynasty, were demolished in 1954 so that Chang'an Avenue could be enlarged.

== List of pagodas ==
Pagoda	Image	Date of construction	Location	Description	Notes
Beizheng Pagoda 北鄭塔		Liao dynasty, 1015	Beizheng Village, Changgou Township, Fangshan District; 39.57°N 115.87°E	Octagonal, thirteen-tiered, multi-eaved style brick pagoda.	On the site of the Chongfu Temple (崇福寺), founded during the Sui or Tang dynasties. The pagoda collapsed in June 1977, and more than 60 religious artefacts were recovered from the ruins.
Biyun Temple (Temple of Azure Clouds) Diamond throne pagoda 碧雲寺金剛寶座塔	Diamond throne pagoda at the Temple of Azure Clouds	Qing dynasty, 1748	Fragrant Hills, Haidian District; 39.9981°N 116.1899°E	Diamond throne pagoda, 34.7 metres (114 ft) in height.	The Temple of Azure Clouds was founded during the Yuan dynasty, and the pagoda constructed as part of the renovation of the temple by the Qianlong Emperor in 1748.
Cishou Temple Pagoda (Pagoda of Everlasting Peace and Long Age) 慈壽寺塔 (長安萬壽塔)	Pagoda at the Cishou Temple	Ming dynasty, 1576	Linglong Park, Balizhuang, Haidian District; 39.9268°N 116.2893°E	Octagonal, thirteen-tiered, multi-eaved style stone and brick pagoda, 50.0 metres (164.0 ft) in height.	At Cishou Temple (慈壽寺), built in 1576 by the Wanli Emperor for the Empress Dowager Li.
Cloud Platform at Juyongguan 居庸關雲臺	The "Cloud Platform" from the south	Yuan dynasty, 1342–1345	Juyongguan Pass, Changping District; 40.289°N 116.068°E	A "straddling the street" style pagoda (過街塔), consisting of an arch base, on which three white stupa style pagodas were erected.	Originally at the south gate to the Yongming Baoxiang Temple (永明寶相寺). The three pagodas on the arch had collapsed by the reign of the Zhengtong Emperor (1427–1464), and now only the arch remains.
Dajue Temple Pagoda (Jialing Sarira Pagoda) 大覺寺塔 (迦陵舍利塔)	The Sarira pagoda of the monk Jialing	Qing dynasty, 1747	Xugezhuang Village, Haidian District; 40.0515°N 116.1000°E	A white stupa style pagoda with an octaogonal base, 12.0 metres (39.4 ft) in height.	Built to store the relics of the monk Jialing 迦陵 (d. 1726), who was abbot of the Dajue Temple during the 1720s.
Duobao Glazed Pagoda 多寶琉璃塔	The glazed pagoda in the Summer Palace	Qing dynasty, 1735–1796	Summer Palace, Haidian District; 39.9995°N 116.2707°E	Three-storeyed pagoda covered with glazed statuettes of buddhas, with double or triple tiers of eaves on each storey.	
Fragrant Hills Pagoda 香山琉璃塔	The Fragrant Hills Pagoda	Qing dynasty, 1780	Fragrant Hills, Haidian District; 39.9945°N 116.1910°E	Octagonal-shaped pagoda with seven stories, 40 metres (130 ft) in height.	
Haotian Pagoda (Liangxiang Pagoda) 昊天塔 (良鄉塔)	Haotian Pagoda in Fangshan District	Liao dynasty, 907–1125	Liangxiang, Fangshan District; 39.7332°N 116.1480°E	Five-storeyed octagonal, hollow brick pagoda, 26.7 metres (88 ft) in height.	Earliest pagoda on the site was constructed during the Sui dynasty (581–618).
Jade Peak Pagoda 玉峰塔	The Jade Peak Pagoda in the Summer Palace	Qing dynasty, 1752	Jade Spring Hill, Summer Palace, Haidian District; 39.9922°N 116.2425°E	Octagonal, seven-storeyed brick and stone pagoda, 30.0 metres (98.4 ft) in height.	Built for the Qianlong Emperor in imitation of the Cishou Pagoda on the Golden Hill in Zhenjiang, Jiangsu.
Lingguang Temple Pagoda 靈光寺塔 (佛牙舍利塔)	The pagoda at Lingguang Temple	1964	Shijingshan District; 39.9525°N 116.1814°E	Octagonal, thirteen-storeyed pagoda, 51 metres (167 ft) in height.	
Luogong Pagoda at White Cloud Temple 白雲觀羅公塔	The Luogong Pagoda at White Cloud Temple	Qing dynasty	Xicheng District; 39.901°N 116.3445°E		
Miaoying Temple White Pagoda 妙應寺白塔	Miaoying Temple stupa style pagoda	Yuan dynasty, 1271–1279	Xicheng District; 39.924°N 116.357°E	White, stupa style pagoda, 50.9 metres (167 ft) in height.	Built on the site of a Liao dynasty pagoda erected in 1092. The current pagoda was commissioned by Kublai Khan in 1271, and its construction was supervised by the Nepali architect Araniko. In 1978, many religious artefacts deposited in the pinnacle of the stupa in 1753 by the Qianlong Emperor were discovered.
Monk Wansong Pagoda 萬松老人塔	The Pagoda of Monk Wansong	Yuan and Qing dynasties	Xicheng District; 39.922°N 116.367°E	Octagonal, nine-storeyed, brick pagoda, 16 metres (52 ft) in height.	A seven-storeyed brick pagoda was built to house the remains of Wansong Xingxiu (1166–1246), but a new nine-storeyed pagoda was built around the original pagoda in 1753, and the original pagoda was only rediscovered in 1986.
Qingshou Temple Twin Pagodas (Pagoda of Haiyun and Pagoda of Ke'an) 慶壽寺雙塔 (海雲塔、可庵塔)	Twin pagodas of Qingshou Temple, circa 1900–1911	Yuan dynasty	Xicheng District; 39.9055°N 116.3460°E	Two octagonal, multi-eaved style pagodas, one named after the temple's eminent abbot, the Chan master Haiyun 海雲 (1203–1257), the other named after Haiyun's disciple, Ke'an 可庵. The Pagoda of Haiyun was nine storeys high, and the Pagoda of Ke'an was seven storeys high.	On the site of the Qingshou Temple (慶壽寺), which was founded during the Jin dynasty, in 1186. The two pagodas were demolished in 1954 to widen Chang'an Avenue.
Randeng Pagoda 燃燈塔	The Randeng Pagoda	Qing dynasty, 1696	Tongzhou District; 39.9153°N 116.6667°E	Octagonal, thirteen-storeyed brick and wooden pagoda, 53 metres (174 ft) in height.	
Silver Mountain Pagoda Forest (Yinshan Talin) 銀山塔林	Group of pagodas at Silver Mountain	Liao dynasty and Jin dynasty, c. 1125	Southwest of Haizi Village, Changping District; 40.318°N 116.324°E	Seven octagonal, stone pagodas.	A group of five pagodas built on the site of the Yanshou Temple (延壽寺), and two separate pagodas. Two of the pagodas date to the Liao dynasty, and five of the pagodas date to the Jin dynasty. The temples were destroyed during the Second Sino-Japanese War.
Tiankai Pagoda 天開塔	Tiankai Pagoda	Liao dynasty, 1110	Tiankai Village, Yuegezhuangzhen, Fangshan District; 39.6185°N 115.8885°E	Octagonal, three-storeyed, multi-storey style pagoda, 15.0 metres (49.2 ft) in height.	On the site of the Tiankai Temple (天開寺), founded during the Tang dynasty. A pagoda was first built on this site during the Tang dynasty, but the present pagoda dates to the Liao dynasty. In 1990, more than 30 religious artefacts were recovered from the pagoda during emergency excavations to secure the safety of the pagoda. The pagoda was restored in 2005.
Tianning Temple pagoda 天寧寺塔	Tianning Temple pagoda from the south	Liao dynasty, c. 1120	Guang'anmen, Xicheng District; 39.894°N 116.340°E	Octagonal, thirteen-storeyed, solid brick and stone pagoda, 57.8 metres (190 ft) in height.	Supposedly built on the site of a wooden pagoda erected under Emperor Wen of Sui in 602.
Wayao Pagoda (Miyan Pagoda; Fengxiang Gongshou Pagoda) 瓦窑塔 (密檐塔, 峰香公壽塔)		Ming dynasty	Between Wayao Village and Liyuan Village, Wangzuo Township, Fengtai District; 39.8150°N 116.1035°E	Seven-tiered, multi-eaved style brick pagoda.	On the site of a temple where there were originally several dozen multi-eaved style brick pagodas dating to the Jin, Yuan and Ming dynasties. All but one of these pagodas were destroyed during the Second Sino-Japanese War.
Wanfotang Ornamental Pagoda 萬佛堂花塔	Wanfotang Ornamental Pagoda	Liao dynasty, 1070	Hall of Ten Thousand Buddhas, Hebei Township, Fengtai District; 39.7892°N 115.9817°E	Octagonal, brick pagoda separated into three vertical sections, with the top section comprising nine layers with niches for Buddhist sculptures all around.	There are inscriptions dating to the Liao, Jin and Yuan dynasties written in ink on the pagoda, including inscriptions dated the 6th year of the Xianyong era (1070) and the 7th year of the Shouchang era (1101).
Wanfotang Multi-eaved Pagoda 萬佛堂密檐塔	Wanfotang Pagoda	Yuan dynasty	Hall of Ten Thousand Buddhas, Hebei Township, Fengtai District; 39.7892°N 115.9817°E	Seven-tiered, multi-eaved style brick pagoda.	
Wugou Pagoda (Nanguan Pagoda) 無垢凈光舍利塔 (南關塔)		Liao dynasty, 1007–1013	Outside the southern gate of the old town, Shunyi District; 40.10°N 116.65°E		On the site of Yilin Temple (義林寺). Destroyed during an earthquake in 1720. In 1963 the underground hall of the pagoda was excavated, and about thirty religious artefacts were discovered.
Yao Guangxiao Pagoda 姚廣孝墓塔	Yao Guangxiao Pagoda	Ming dynasty, 1418	Changlesi Village, Qinglonghu Town, Fangshan District; 39.820°N 116.080°E	Nine-storeyed pagoda, 33 metres (108 ft) in height.	Master Yao Guangxiao (1335–1418) was buried underneath this pagoda.
Yexian Pagoda 冶仙塔		Liao dynasty, 1039	Mount Ye, Miyun County; 40.405°N 116.865°E	Octagonal, three-storeyed, multi-storey style pagoda, 12.0 metres (39.4 ft) in height.	On the site of the Puzhao Temple (普照寺). Destroyed in the mid 20th century. In 1988 the pagoda base was excavated, and more than 40 religious artefacts, as well as a large quantity of coins, were found.
Yong'an Temple White Pagoda (Beihai Park White Pagoda) 永安寺白塔 (北海公園白塔)	White pagoda in Beihai Park	Qing dynasty, 1651	Qionghua Island, Beihai Park, Xicheng District; 39.9245°N 116.383°E	White stupa style pagoda, 35.9 metres (118 ft) in height.	Reconstructed in 1679 and 1731 after being severely damaged by earthquakes. Further repaired in 1976 after the Tangshan earthquake.
Yongding Pagoda 永定塔	Yongding Pagoda	2013	Fengtai District; 39.8797°N 116.1725°E	Octagonal wooden pagoda, 69.7 metres (229 ft) in height.	A large wooden pagoda built for the Beijing International Garden Expo.
Yunju Temple North Pagoda (Pagoda for Preserving Stone Scriptures) 雲居寺北塔 (續秘藏石經塔)	Yunju Temple North Pagoda	Liao dynasty, 1118	Fangshan District; 39.6089°N 115.7671°E	Octagonal, eleven-tiered, multi-eaved style stone pagoda, 30 metres (98 ft) in height.	Built to house Buddhist scriptures engraved on stone tablets during the reign of Emperor Daozong of Liao. Between 1957 and 1958 10,082 stone tablets engraved with Buddhist scriptures during the Liao and Jin dynasties were recovered from the underground hall in the pagoda.
Yunju Temple South Pagoda 雲居寺南塔	Yunju Temple South Pagoda	2014	Fangshan District; 39.6072°N 115.7677°E		First built in 1117, it was destroyed during the Second Sino-Japanese War, and it was rebuilt in 2014.
Yunju Temple Stone Pagoda 雲居寺石塔	A stone pagoda at Yunju Temple, c. 711, Tang dynasty	Tang dynasty, 711	Fangshan District; 39.9055°N 116.3460°E	A square-shaped stone pagoda.	It is one of the few remaining Tang dynasty stone pagodas in the grounds of the temple complex.
Zhenjue Temple Diamond throne pagoda 真覺寺金剛寶座塔	Zhenjue Temple diamond throne pagoda	Ming dynasty, 1473	Haidian District; 39.943°N 116.324°E	Diamond throne pagoda, with a square base 7.7 metres (25 ft) in height, surmounted by four eleven-storeyed square-based pagodas at the corners and one thirteen-storeyed square-based pagoda in the middle. In total the diamond throne pagoda is 17 metres (56 ft) in height.	Modelled after the Mahabodhi Temple in Bodh Gaya, India.

== Bibliography ==
- Archaeological Team of Beijing (1962). 北京名勝古跡 [Places of Historic Interest and Scenic Beauty in Beijing]. Beijingshi Wenwu Gongzuodui.
- Aldrich, M. A. (2006). The Search for a Vanishing Beijing: A Guide to China's Capital Through the Ages. Hong Kong University Press. ISBN 978-962-209-777-3.
- Wang, Jun (2011). Beijing Record: A Physical and Political History of Planning Modern Beijing. World Scientific. ISBN 978-9814295727.
