= 1959 in architecture =

The year 1959 in architecture involved some significant architectural events and new buildings.

== Events ==
- Boardman Hall at Cornell University, designed by William Henry Miller and built in 1892, is demolished

== Buildings and structures ==
=== Buildings opened ===
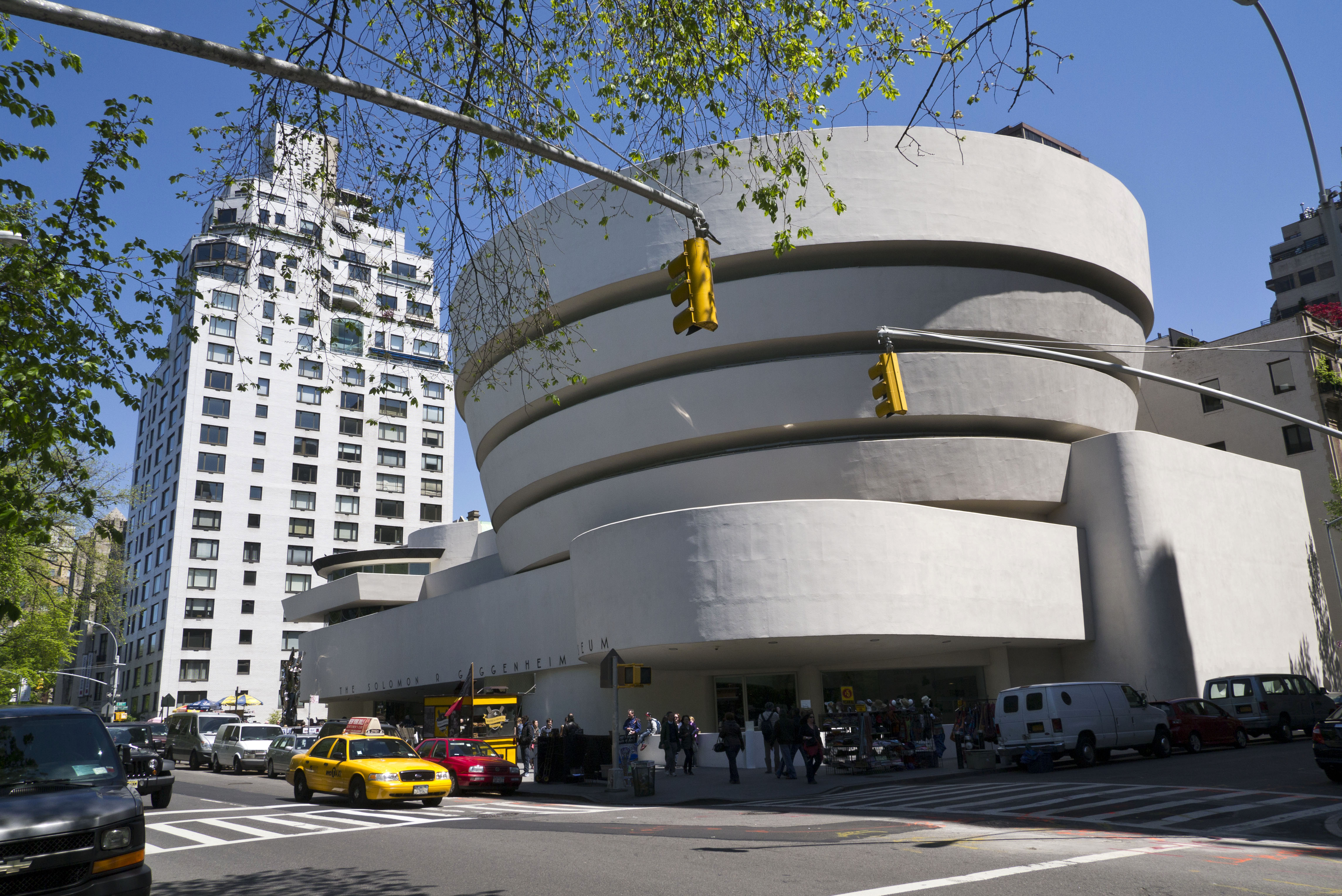
Solomon R. Guggenheim Museum in New York City, USA

- May 3 – Birmingham Museum of Art (new building), Birmingham, Alabama, by Warren, Knight & Davis.
- October 21 – Solomon R. Guggenheim Museum in New York City, designed by Frank Lloyd Wright (died April 9).

=== Buildings completed ===
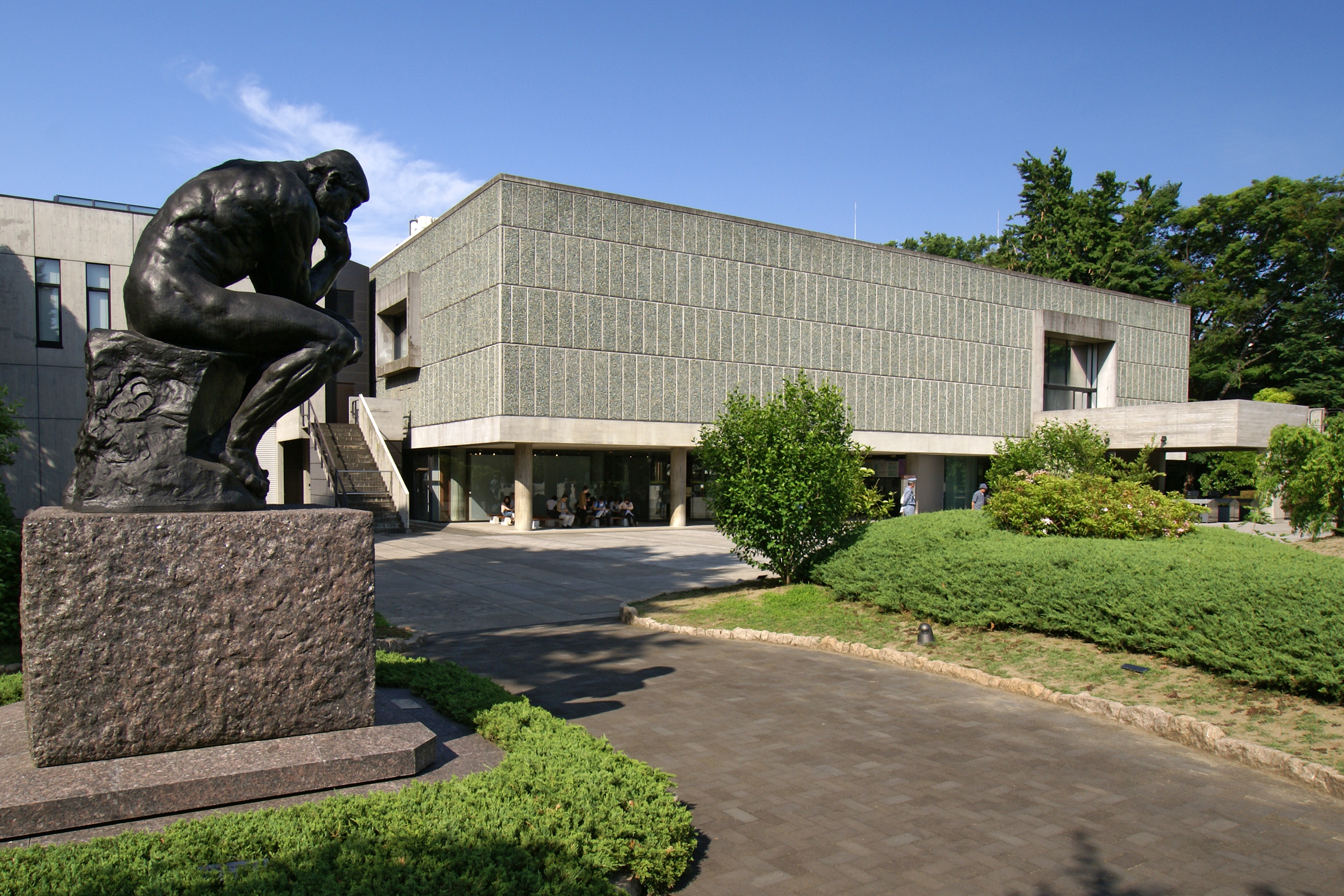
National Museum of Western Art, Tokyo, Japan

- Basilica of Candelaria, Tenerife, Canary Islands, designed by architect José Enrique Marrero Regalado.
- Case Study House #21: Bailey House and #22: Stahl House, by architect Pierre Koenig.
- Zigzag House, Sarasota, Florida, designed by architect Tollyn Twitchell.
- 6 Bacon's Lane, Highgate, London, designed by architect Leonard Manasseh for himself.
- Chase Tower, Detroit, Michigan, designed by Albert Kahn Associates.
- Kariba Dam completed between Zambia and Zimbabwe on the Zambezi River.
- The Sidney Myer Music Bowl, Melbourne, Australia.
- Ten Great Buildings project completed in Beijing, China.
- Bracken House, the Financial Times headquarters in the City of London, designed by Sir Albert Richardson.
- Lincoln Motors showrooms and garage, Brayford Pool, Lincoln, England, designed by Sam Scorer of Denis Clarke Hall, Scorer and Bright; engineer Dr K. Hajnal-Kónyi.
- Pride Cleaners, Chicago, designed by Gerald Siegwart.
- National Museum of Western Art, Tokyo, designed by Le Corbusier.
- Finmere Church of England Primary School, England, designed by Mary and David Medd.

== Awards ==
- AIA Gold Medal – Walter Gropius.
- RIBA Royal Gold Medal – Ludwig Mies van der Rohe.

== Births ==
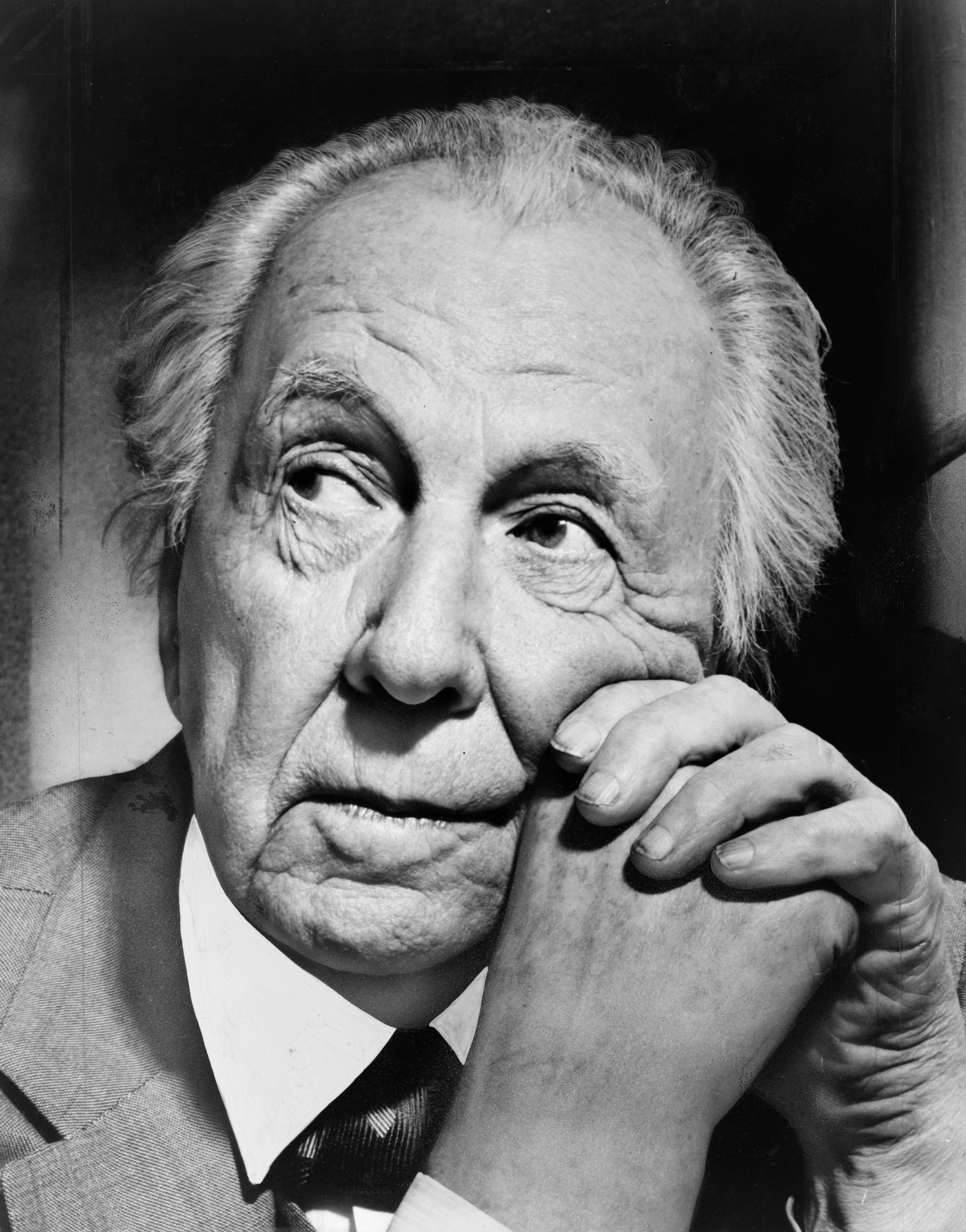
Frank Lloyd Wright

- October 10 – Maya Lin, American designer and artist
- October 10 – Michael Maltzan, American architect
- Jacques Ferrier, French architect
- Lorcan O'Herlihy, Irish-born architect working in the United States

== Deaths ==
- February 23 – Gordon Wilson, Australian-born New Zealand government architect (born 1900)
- April 9 – Frank Lloyd Wright, American architect (born 1867)
