= 1780 in architecture =

The year 1780 in architecture involved some significant events.

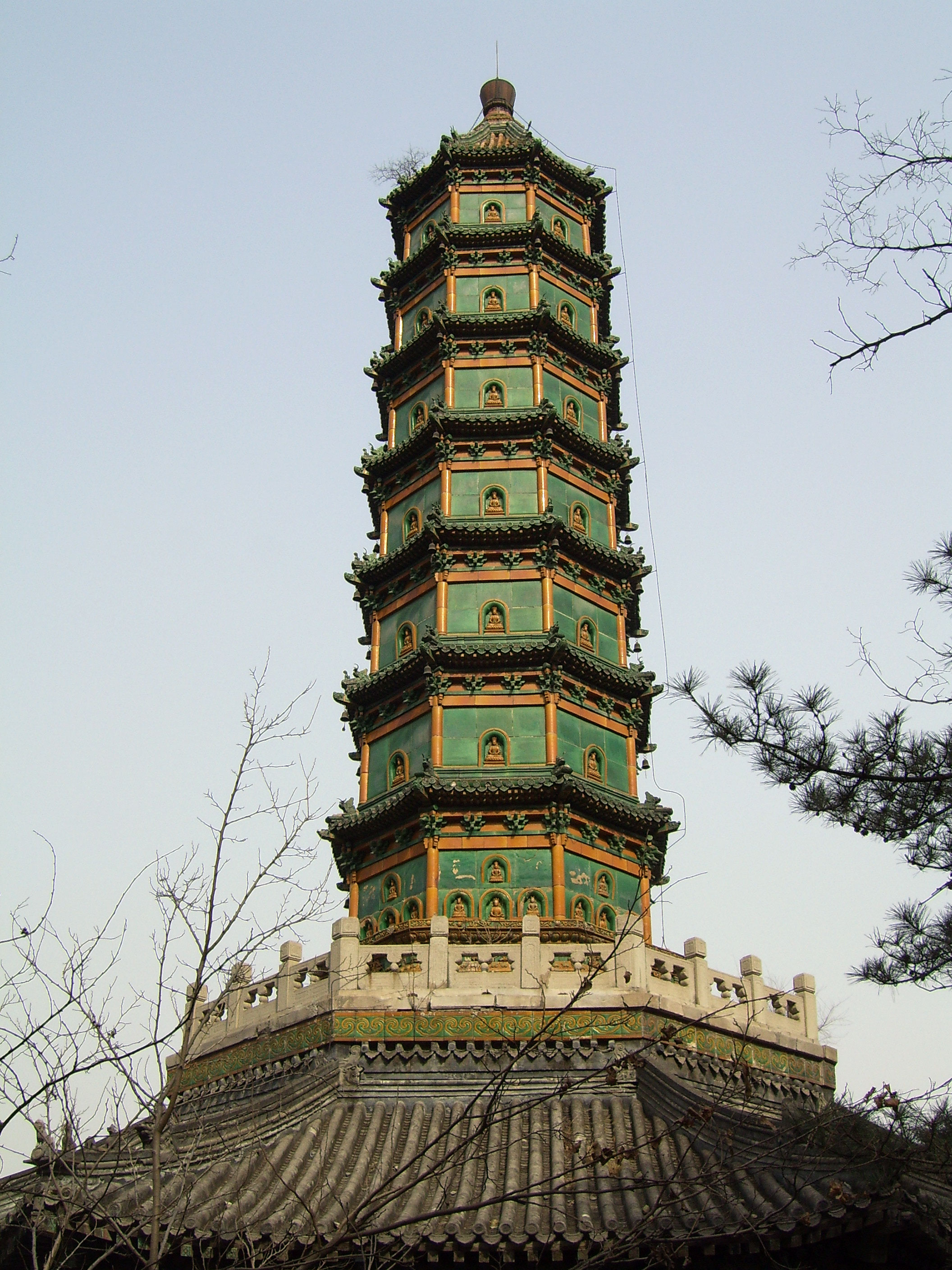
Fragrant Hills Pagoda

== Buildings and structures ==
=== Buildings ===
- April 17 – Grand Théâtre de Bordeaux in France, designed by Victor Louis is inaugurated.
- June 24 – Chesme Church in Saint Petersburg, designed by Yury Felten, is consecrated.
- Assumption Cathedral, Kharkiv, Ukraine, is consecrated.
- Fragrant Hills Pagoda in China is completed.
- Kashi Vishwanath Temple on the Ganges in Varanasi, Uttar Pradesh, is built.
- Xumi Fushou Temple in Chengde Mountain Resort, China, is built.
- Royal Villa of Monza in Lombardy, designed by Giuseppe Piermarini, is completed.
- Reconstruction of Palazzo Tucci in Lucca, Tuscany by Ottaviano Diodati is commissioned.

== Births ==
- October 1 – Robert Smirke, English architect (died 1867)

== Deaths ==
- April 23 – Sanderson Miller, English Gothic Revival architect and landscape designer (born 1716)
- August 29 – Jacques-Germain Soufflot, French architect (born 1713)
