= 1713 in architecture =

The year 1713 in architecture involved some significant events.

== Events ==
- February 25 – Death of Frederick I of Prussia pauses work on Charlottenburg Palace in Berlin.

== Buildings and structures ==
=== Buildings ===
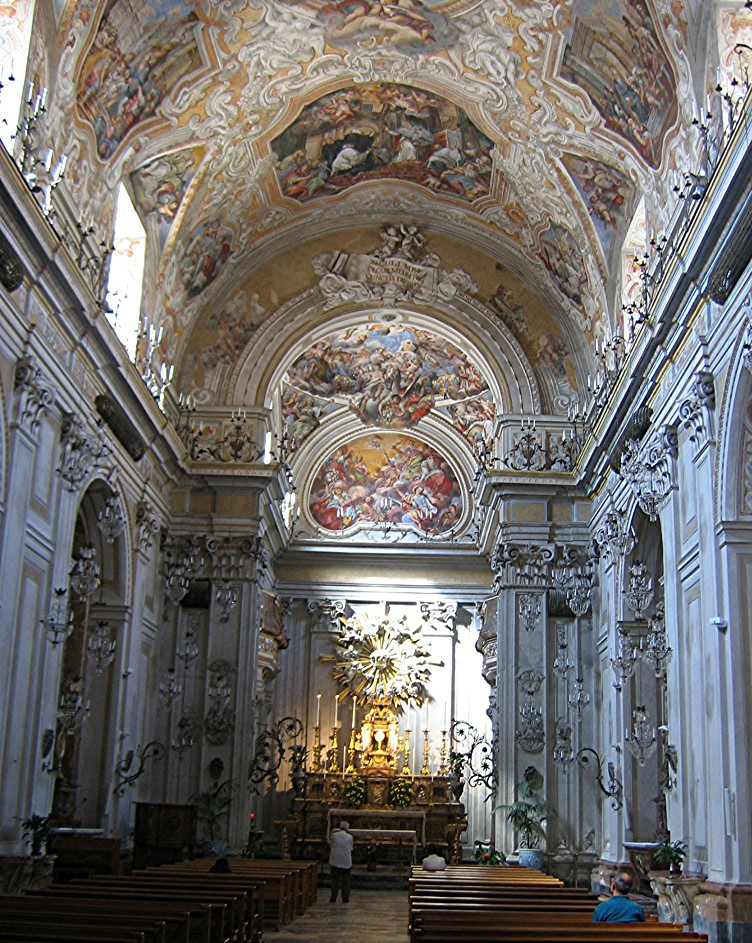
San Benedetto, Catania

- Old State House (Boston) in Massachusetts, possibly designed by Robert Twelves, is completed.
- Church of San Benedetto, Catania in Sicily is completed.
- Spandauische Kirche, Berlin, designed by Philipp Gerlach, is consecrated.
- Schelf Church at Schwerin in the Duchy of Mecklenburg-Schwerin, is rebuilt.
- Vizianagaram fort in South India is built.

== Births ==
- January 22 – Marc-Antoine Laugier, French architectural historian (died 1769)
- July 18 – Gaetano Matteo Pisoni, Ticinese architect (died 1782)
- July 22 – Jacques-Germain Soufflot, French neoclassical architect (died 1780)
- October 30 – Giuseppe Antonio Landi, Bolognese neoclassical architect and ceiling painter working in Brazil (died 1791)
- December 27 – Giovanni Battista Borra, Italian architect and engineer (died 1770)
- John Gwynn, English architect (died 1786)
- Ivan Hryhorovych-Barskyi, Ukrainian baroque architect (died 1785)
- James "Athenian" Stuart, English neoclassical architect and painter (died 1788)

== Deaths ==
- September 9 – Giovanni Antonio Viscardi, Swiss baroque architect working in Bavaria (born 1645)
- Antonio Riva, Rhaetian baroque architect and builder (born 1650)
