= 1716 in architecture =

The year 1716 in architecture involved some significant architectural events and new buildings.

== Events ==
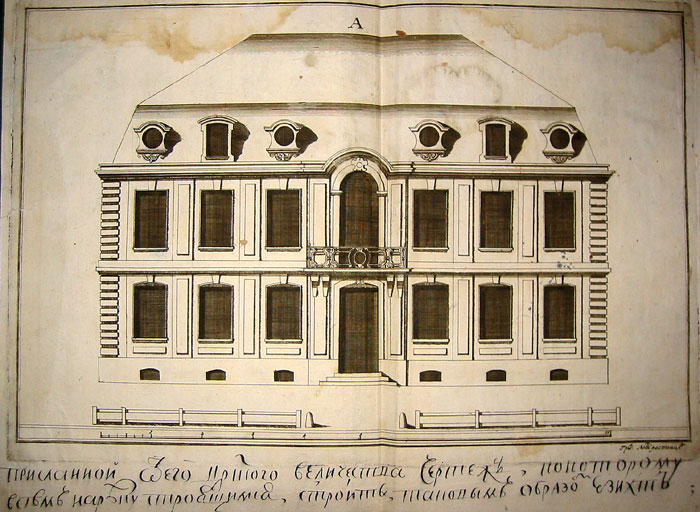
Le Blond's standard design for Saint Peterburg buildings, 1716

- December 18 – James Gibbs joins the "Vandykes clubb", also called the Club of St Luke for "Virtuosi in London". Its members include William Kent and William Talman; other notable members with whom Gibbs would later work include the garden designer Charles Bridgeman and the sculptor John Michael Rysbrack who sculpts many of the memorials Gibbs designs.
- Jean-Baptiste Alexandre Le Blond becomes chief architect of Saint Petersburg in Russia.
- Italian architect and sculptor Carlo Bartolomeo Rastrelli relocates to Russia to work on a bust of Alexander Menshikov; he works there for the rest of his life.
- Nicholas Hawksmoor advises on the restoration of Beverley Minster in the north of England.

== Buildings and structures ==
=== Buildings ===
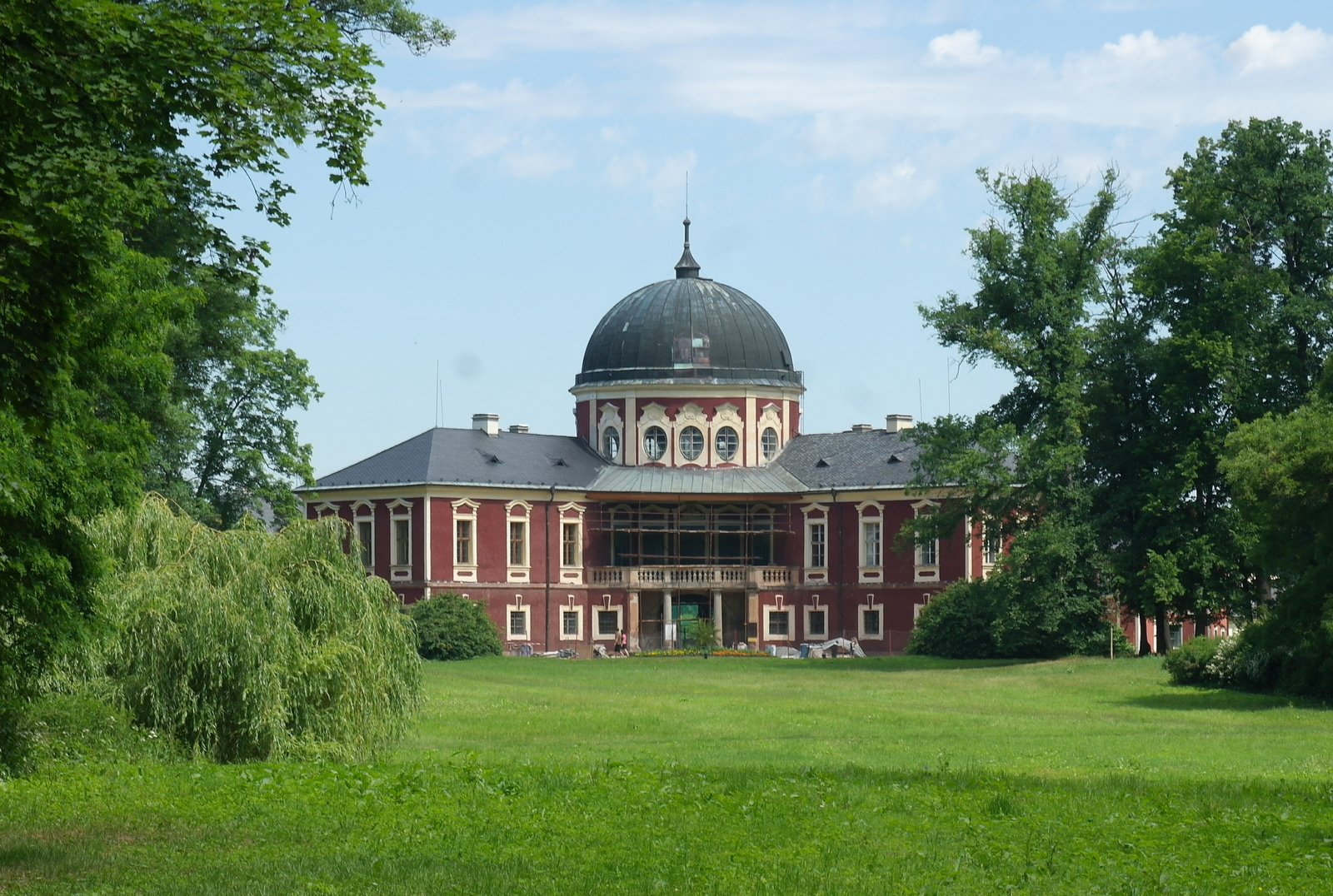
Veltrusy Mansion, Bohemia

- June 21 – Work begins on construction of the Codrington Library at All Souls College, Oxford, to the design of Nicholas Hawksmoor; it will be completed in 1751.
- America's first lighthouse, Boston Light, is built; it will be destroyed in the American Revolution and rebuilt in 1783.
- In Buenos Aires, Argentina, a monastery is built by Franciscan Recoleto monks; the complex will serve as a hospital during the English invasions.
- Schloß Oberhof, Grünstadt, Rhineland.
- Veltrusy Mansion, Bohemia, designed by František Maxmilián Kaňka.
- Lasha Great Mosque, Lhasa, Tibet.
- Work begins on Kneuterdijk Palace, in The Hague, Netherlands, built by Daniel Marot for the Count of Wassenaar-Obdam.

== Births ==
- January 20 – Franz Wilhelm Rabaliatti, German court architect and builder (died 1782)
- January 30 – Carl Fredrik Adelcrantz, Swedish architect (died 1796)
- March 5 – Nicolò Pacassi, Austrian architect (died 1790)
- June 14 – Peter Harrison, English-born architect, active in the Rhode Island colony (died 1775)
- August 30 (bapt.) – Lancelot "Capability" Brown, English landscape architect (died 1783)
- date unknown – Sanderson Miller, English Gothic Revival architect and landscape designer (died 1780)

== Deaths ==
- February 3 – Giuseppe Alberti, Italian Baroque painter and architect (born 1664)
