= 1783 in architecture =

The year 1783 in architecture involved some significant architectural events and new buildings.

== Events ==
- September 24 – The Bolshoi Kamenny Theatre, in Saint Petersburg, Russia, designed by Antonio Rinaldi, opens with a performance of Paisiello's opera Il mondo della luna.

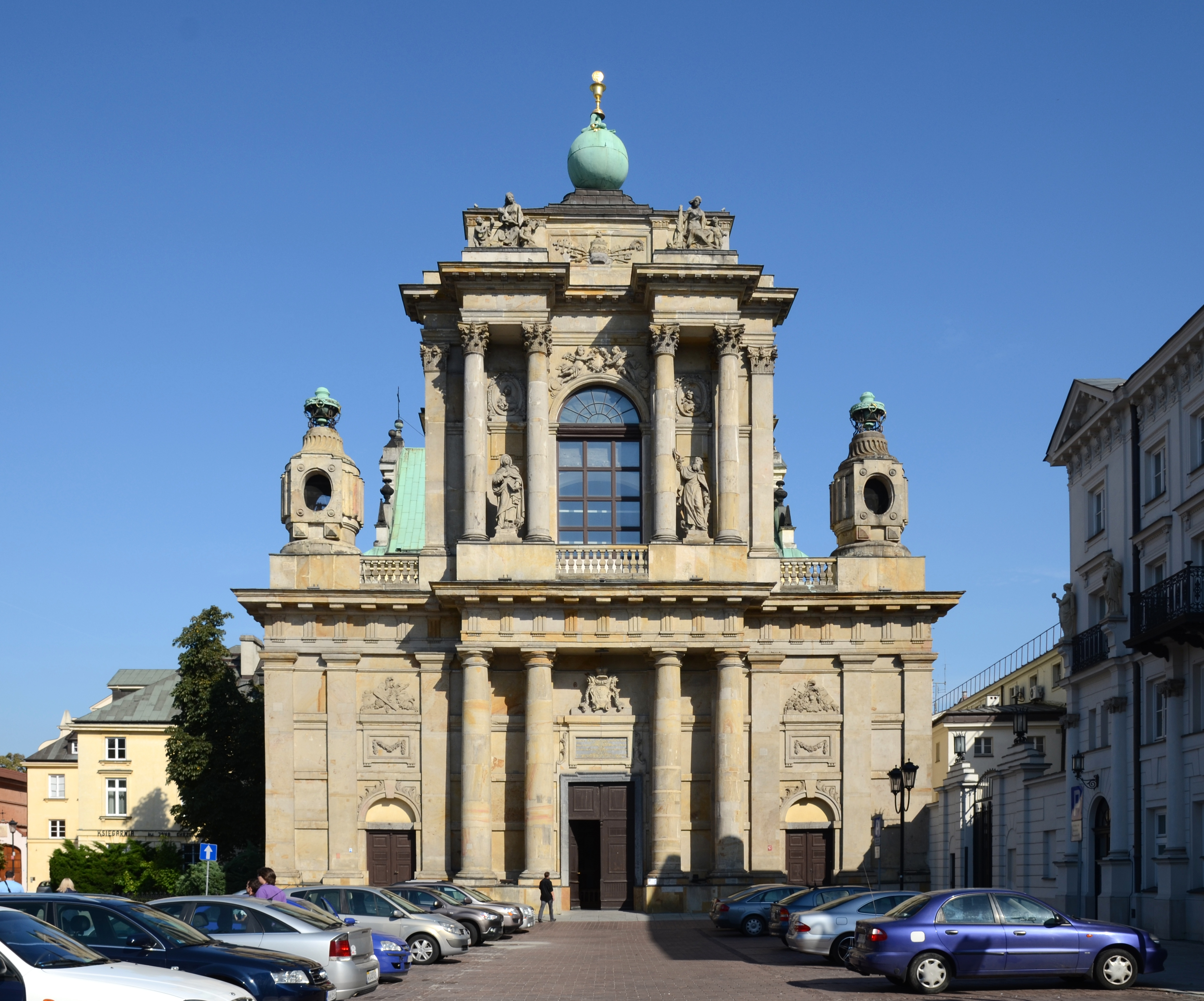
Façade of Carmelite Church, Warsaw

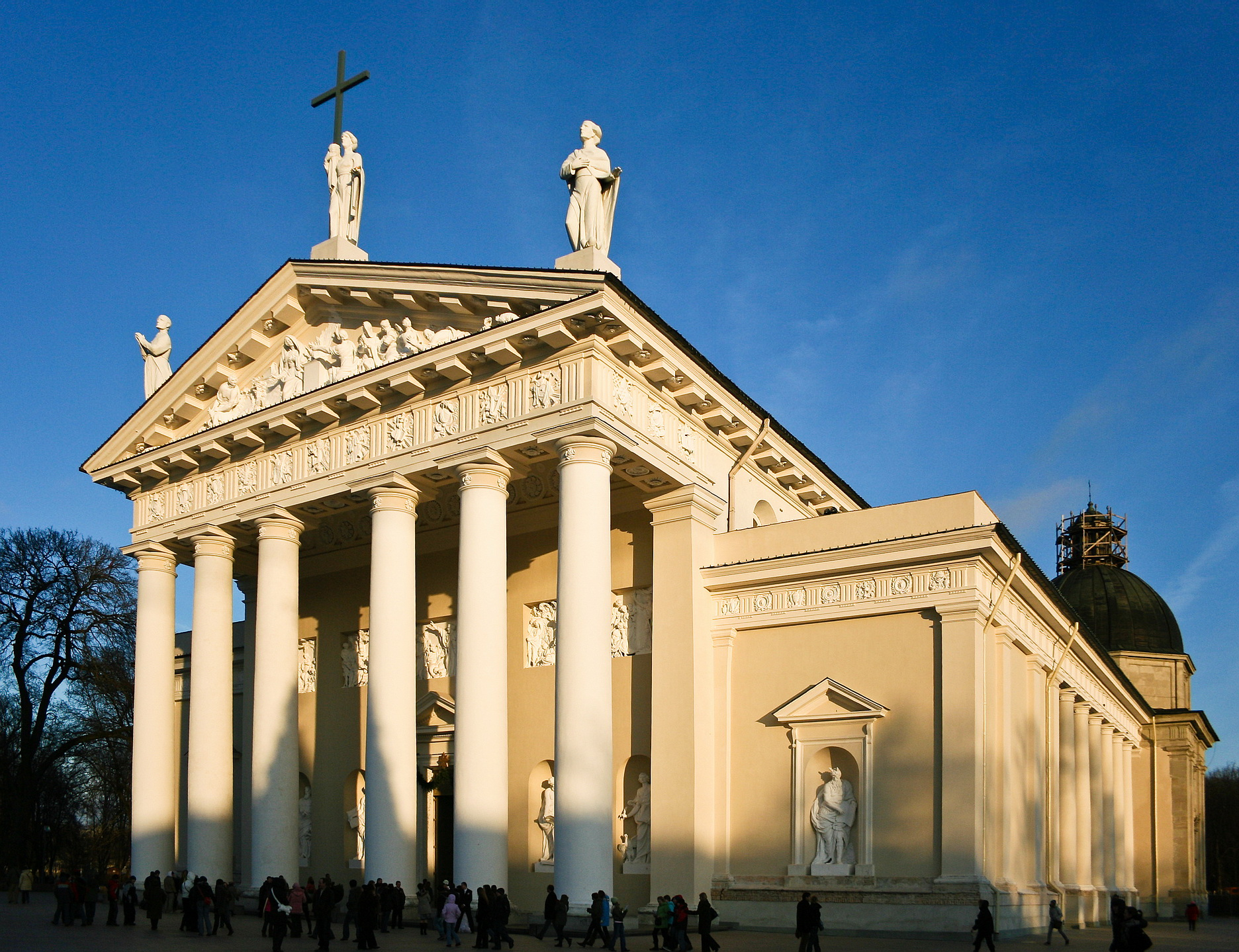
Vilnius Cathedral

== Buildings and structures ==
=== Buildings completed ===
- New Vilnius Cathedral in the Grand Duchy of Lithuania, designed by Laurynas Gucevičius, is consecrated.
- Façade of Carmelite Church, Warsaw, Poland, designed by Efraim Szreger, is completed
- Laleli Mosque, Istanbul, Turkey, is rebuilt after a fire.
- Boston Light (lighthouse) rebuilt on the site of an earlier one destroyed in the American Revolution.

== Awards ==
- Grand Prix de Rome, architecture: Antoine Vaudoyer.

== Births ==
- May 14 – Giuseppe Jappelli, Venetian architect (died 1852)
- June 2 – Solomon Willard, Massachusetts craftsman, architect and builder (died 1861)

== Deaths ==
- February 6 – Capability Brown, English landscape architect (born 1716)
