= Haotian Pagoda =

Liao dynasty tower in Beijing, China

Coordinates: 39.7332°N 116.1480°E

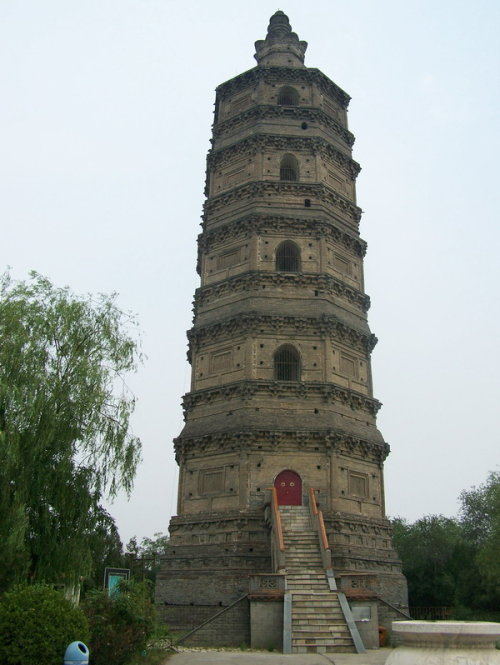
Haotian Pagoda

Haotian Pagoda (Chinese: 昊天塔; pinyin: Hàotiān Tǎ) or Liangxiang Pagoda (simplified Chinese: 良乡塔; traditional Chinese: 良鄉塔; pinyin: Liángxiāng Tǎ) is an octagonal brick pagoda situated in Haotian park in the Fangshan District of Beijing. It has 5 octahedral shaped hollow tiers and is 36m high. Originally constructed during Sui dynasty, the pagoda has been rebuilt a few times in the last few centuries. The brick tower standing today was built during the Liao dynasty (907–1125). In 1984 and 1997, the Beijing Municipal Administration of Cultural Heritage donated a total of over 16 million Chinese yuan for restoration works. As of September 2017 Haotian park is closed for renovations of the pagoda.

== Features ==
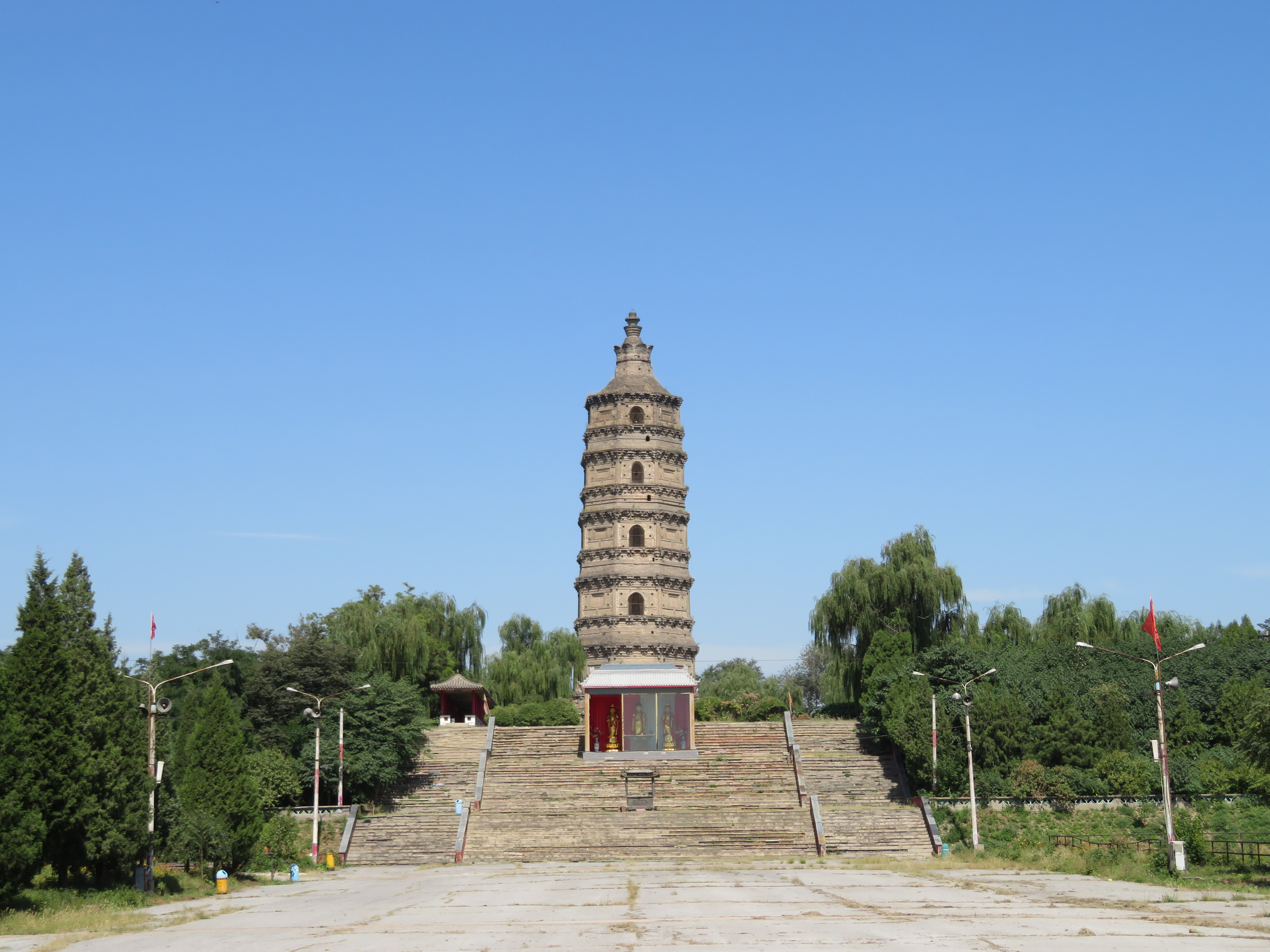
View of Haotian Pagoda from the south

Haotian is the only hollow Buddhist pagoda standing in Beijing. Each of the 5 tiers has 4 doors (辟券门), facing the north, south, east and west. Zhiling windows (直棂窗) are present in the north-east, north-west, south-east and south-west directions. Originally, there were 4 buddha sculptures on each floor, but most of them have been damaged by the Eight-Nation Alliance in 1901. A spiral staircase inside the tower can be used to climb to the top, which gave a view of the capital in the 12th century. Each floor also has little orifices (瞭望孔) and might have been used for military purposes in the war between Liao and Song dynasty.

The Haotian Pagoda is now a part of Haotian Park (昊天公园) that opened in 1998. In addition to the pagoda, Haotian Park features a lake (昊天湖) and several pavilions. The entrance fee is 5 yuan.

== Transportation ==
Haotian Pagoda is situated in Liangxiang of Fangshan District. Public bus can be used to access the pagoda. The bus stop Liangxiangdongguan (良乡东关) of line 646, 832, 834, 835, 951, 971, 993, Fang 1 (Nei), Fang 1 (Wai), Fang 27 and Fang 39 is within walking distance of the entrance of Haotian Park.

== See also ==
- Fangshan District
- History of Beijing
- List of landmarks in Beijing
- List of pagodas in Beijing
