= Duobao Glazed Pagoda =

Chinese Buddhist pagoda in the Summer Palace of Beijing

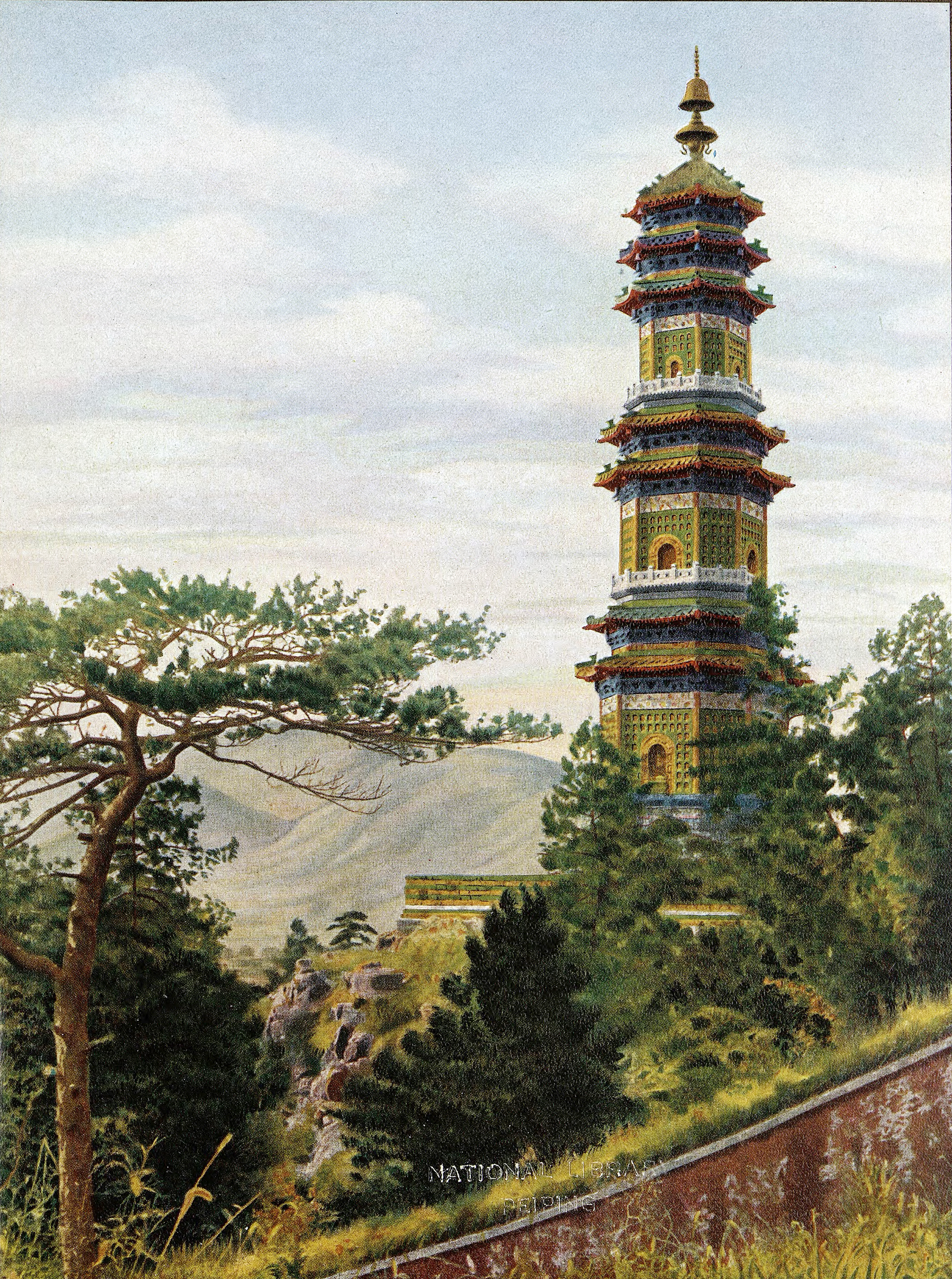
Duobao Glazed Pagoda

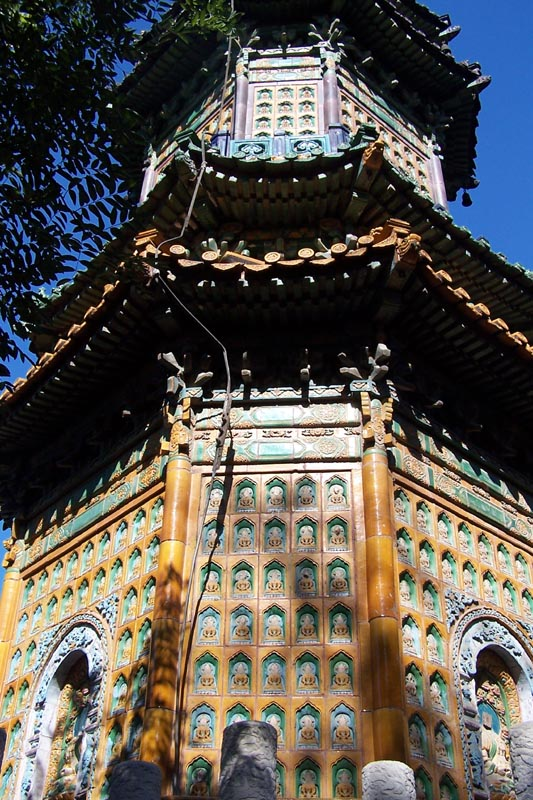
Duobao Glazed Pagoda

Duobao Glazed Pagoda (simplified Chinese: 多宝琉璃塔; traditional Chinese: 多寶琉璃塔; pinyin: Duōbǎo Liúlítǎ) is a Chinese Buddhist pagoda at the back of Longevity Hill inside the Summer Palace of Beijing, China. It was built during the reign of the Qianlong Emperor (1735-1796) of the Qing Dynasty.

The pagoda is mostly noteworthy for its decoration: it is completely covered in tiny glazed Buddhist statues. It has three stories, each with double or triple-layer eaves supported with brackets.

== See also ==
- Jade Peak Pagoda
- List of pagodas in Beijing
