= Zigzag House =

Residential home in Sarasota, Florida, U.S.

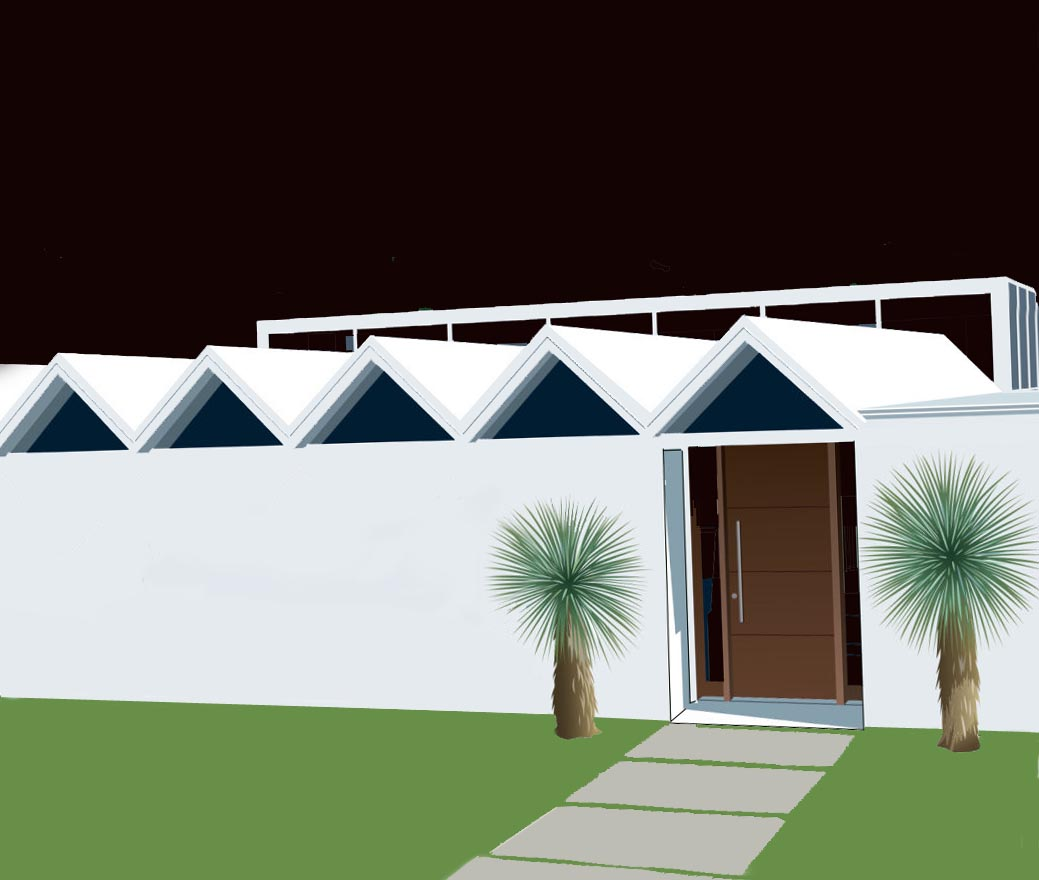
- Zigzag House (Artist rendering)
- Interactive map of the Zigzag House area

General information
- Type: Single family home
- Architectural style: Mid-century modern
- Location: 1332 Westway Drive, Sarasota, Florida, United States
- Coordinates: 27°19′46″N 82°35′00″W
- Construction started: 1958
- Completed: 1959
- Renovated: 2017–2019
- Client: Rita Adler

Height
- Roof: Zigzag

Technical details
- Floor count: 1
- Floor area: 3,419 ft (1,042 m)

Design and construction
- Architect: Tollyn Twitchell
- Known for: Zigzag (saw tooth) roofline

Renovating team
- Architect: Seibert Architects
- Awards and prizes: American Institute of Architects and Society of American Registered Architects

The Zigzag House (1959) is a residential house in Sarasota, Florida, United States. It was designed by architect Tollyn Twitchell in the style of the Sarasota School of Architecture: the style is also referred to as a mid-century modern. The home has been named for its zigzag roofline which resembles saw teeth.

== Style ==
The Zigzag House is seen as an example of the Sarasota School of Architecture. The building was designed by Tollyn Twitchell, whose father, Ralph Twitchell, is thought of as the founder of the Sarasota School. The building is classified as mid-century modern architecture and it is designed in the style of the Sarasota School. The home has square open spaces inside with a large roof overhang layered behind the main space adding to the indoor/outdoor quality of that space. It features large windows.

== Design ==
In 1959 Twitchell designed the home with a unique roofline. The home has been nicknamed the "Zigzag House" based on its unique sawtooth roofline and it is located in Sarasota, Florida. The house was designed for a philanthropist named Rita Adler. Sydney and Rita Adler were supporters of the circus arts.

There are two separate wings within the house with the main space bridging between them. The master bedroom with a separate dressing room, shower and a bathtub, a study and library/media room in one wing and two bedrooms with individual bathrooms are located in the other section of the home with a spare room for occasional guests located between. This space is also a connected to the main living room of the home to allow openness in that direction. The kitchen follows the open-concept floor plan. The pool area serves as an extension of the main space allowing open views to the pool and garden.

The sawtooth roof structure is made with a honeycomb material which comes from a mid-century design. Following the design elements of the Sarasota School of Architecture, the home attempts to seamlessly combine indoor and outdoor spaces. The home has built-in furniture, and curved cabinetry.

=== Renovations ===
Much of the original materials had been damaged and the layout of the house had been altered and added onto. The building underwent major renovations to bring order to the chaos of the random changes the house had suffered over the years and to restore the spirit of the original design. The owners of the building are Roberto and Clare Arguedas and they purchased it in 2014. The couple undertook the major renovations to the property. Several 21st century upgrades were also part of the renovation: including the electrical system, air-conditioning, new windows and sliding glass doors, and interior finishes, doors, lighting, etc. In 2021 the home was put up for sale with an asking price of $3 million. The real estate agent selling the property said a buyer would, "...appreciate its historical significance, contemporary appointments...".

== Awards ==
The home was renovated by Seibert Architects after many years of neglect. It took three years (2017–2019) to renovate, and when completed it won a, 2020 AIA Florida/Caribbean Award of Excellence. Also in 2020, the home received two national architectural awards: one from the American Institute of Architects and another from the Society of American Registered Architects.
