= 1867 in architecture =

The year 1867 in architecture involved some significant architectural events and new buildings.

== Events ==
- May 12 – Construction work begins on Toluca Cathedral in Mexico.
- May 20 – Queen Victoria lays the foundation stone for the Royal Albert Hall in London, designed by Captain Francis Fowke and Colonel H. Y. Darracott Scott.
- Joseph Monier patents reinforced concrete.
- Ildefons Cerdà publishes Teoría General de la Urbanización ("General Theory of Urbanization").
- The United States Congress directs the United States Army Corps of Engineers to begin improvements on the Navigation Structures at Frankfort Harbor, Michigan.

== Buildings and structures ==
=== Buildings opened ===
- January 1 – The John A. Roebling Suspension Bridge in Cincinnati, Ohio and Covington, Kentucky, United States
- May 11 – St Nedelya Church, Sofia, Bulgaria (rebuilt)
- July 30 – Kvæfjord Church, Norway, designed by Jacob Wilhelm Nordan
- July 31 – St Giles Church, Willenhall, England (consecrated)
- September 27 – Zagreb Synagogue (consecrated)

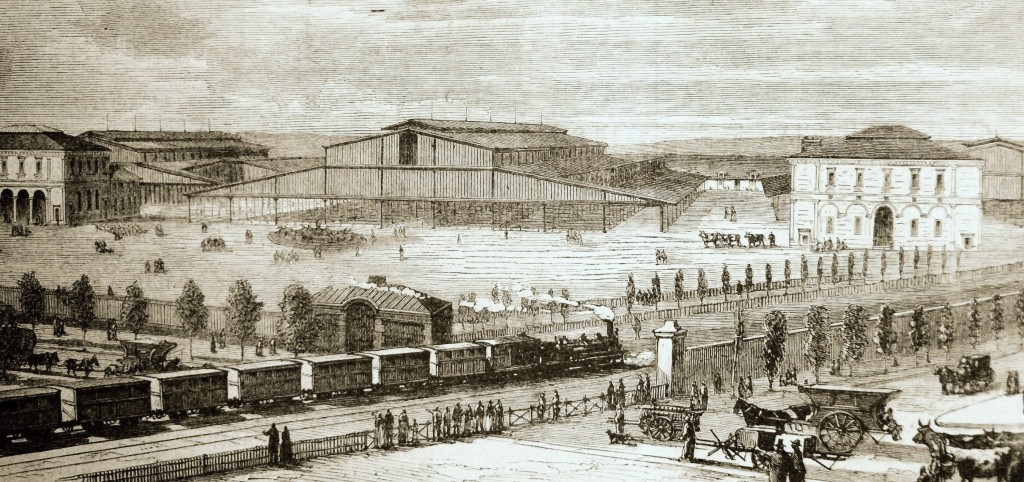
Grande halle de la Villette

=== Buildings completed ===
- Russian-American Building No. 29, Sitka, Alaska
- Grande halle de la Villette (abattoir), Paris, France, designed by Jules de Mérindol and Louis-Adolphe Janvier

== Awards ==
- RIBA Royal Gold Medal – Charles Texier.
- Grand Prix de Rome, architecture – Émile Bénard.

== Births ==
- February 2 - Theodate Pope Riddle, American architect (died 1946)
- March 10 – Hector Guimard, French Art Nouveau architect (died 1942)
- April 27 – Charles Nicholson, English ecclesiastical architect (died 1949)
- June 8 – Frank Lloyd Wright, American architect, interior designer, writer and educator (died 1959)
- June 22 – John A. Pearson, English-born Canadian architect (died 1940)
- August 15 - Henry Hornbostel, American architect and academic (died 1967)
- October 11 – Francis Rattenbury, English-born Canadian architect (murdered 1935)
- October 17 – Josep Puig i Cadafalch, Catalan Spanish Modernista architect (died 1956)
- November 24 – Detmar Blow, English Arts and Crafts architect (died 1939)

== Deaths ==
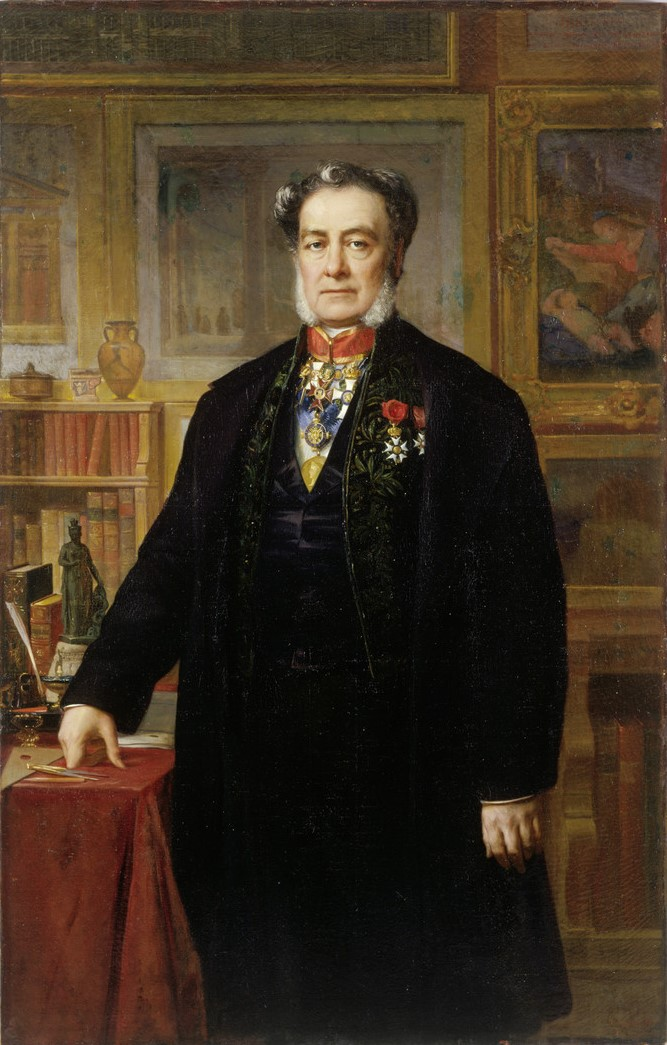
Jakob Ignaz Hittorff

- March 6 – József Hild, Hungarian architect (born 1789)
- March 25 – Jakob Ignaz Hittorff, Franco-German architect, who supervised changes at Palais Beauharnais in Paris (born 1792)
- April 18 – Robert Smirke, English Greek Revival architect (born 1780)
