= Palazzo Tucci =

Coordinates: 43°50′41.10″N 10°30′10.40″E

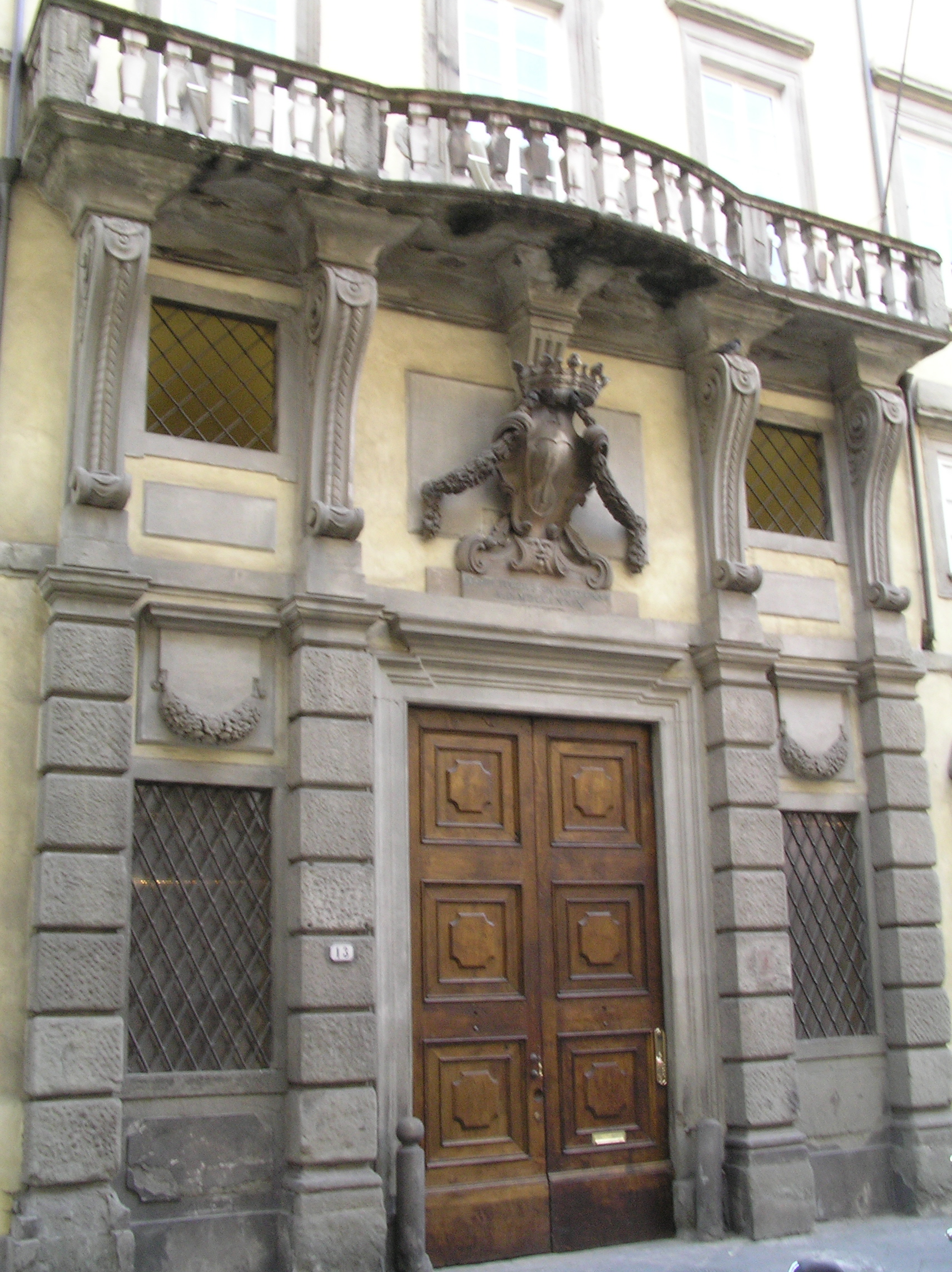
Palazzo Tucci, front view.

Palazzo Tucci is an 18th-century palace in central Lucca, Region of Tuscany, Italy.

== History ==
A number of medieval houses at this site were linked by the ownership of the Tucci family, and in 1780, with the marriage of Giuseppe Tucci to the daughter of the aristocrat Giuseppe Guinigi, the former commissioned a reconstruction by Ottaviano Diodati. The façade style transitions from late Baroque architecture to Neoclassicism. The portal has the coat of arms of the family. The erudite Diodati who was active in theater and garden design, added decorative and dramatic effects to the interior and exterior, including the entrance stairwell. Rooms have the somewhat restrained stucco decoration of the period. The main room has a ceiling frescoed with Flora and the Four Seasons. This and other canvases were mainly by Giovanni Domenico Paladini.

The palace is still owned by the Tucci family and houses a small hotel. The musician Alfredo Catalani was born in this palace.
