= Jade Peak Pagoda =

Chinese pagoda on Jade Spring Hill, Beijing

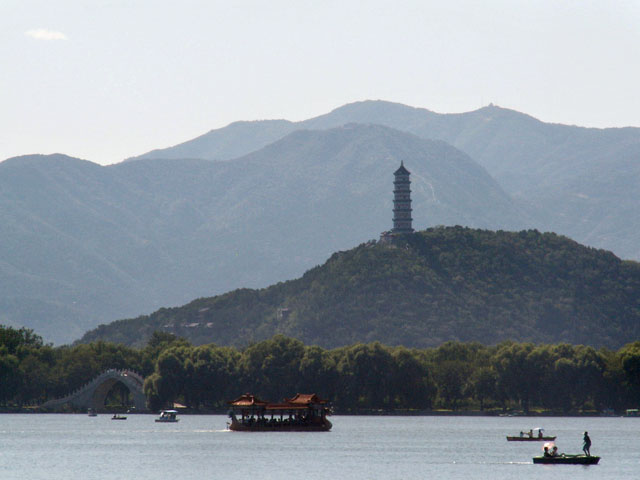
Jade Peak Pagoda

The Jade Peak Pagoda (Chinese: 玉峰塔; pinyin: Yù Fēng Tǎ) is a Chinese pagoda on Jade Spring Hill in an Imperial Garden, Jingming Yuan (Chinese: 靜明園; pinyin: Jìng Míng Yuán), in Beijing, China. The site was originally an imperial retreat during the Liao dynasty (907–1125) and was renovated by the Qianlong Emperor (r. 1735–1796) in 1752.

The pagoda is 30 metres (98 ft) high, has seven stories, has an octagonal base and frame, and is built of brick and stone. Its design imitates the Cishou Pagoda of Jiangtian Temple on the Golden Hill, near Zhenjiang, Jiangsu. It was designed to appear similar to wooden structures. All eight sides on every level feature doors and windows. The walls are thick, and the interior features a wide spiral stone staircase. Niches in the walls of each storey include carved couplets by the Qianlong Emperor and once held a set of bronze Buddhas.

== See also ==
- Duobao Glazed Pagoda, another renowned pagoda in the Summer Palace
