= 1782 in architecture =

The year 1782 in architecture involved some significant events.

== Buildings ==
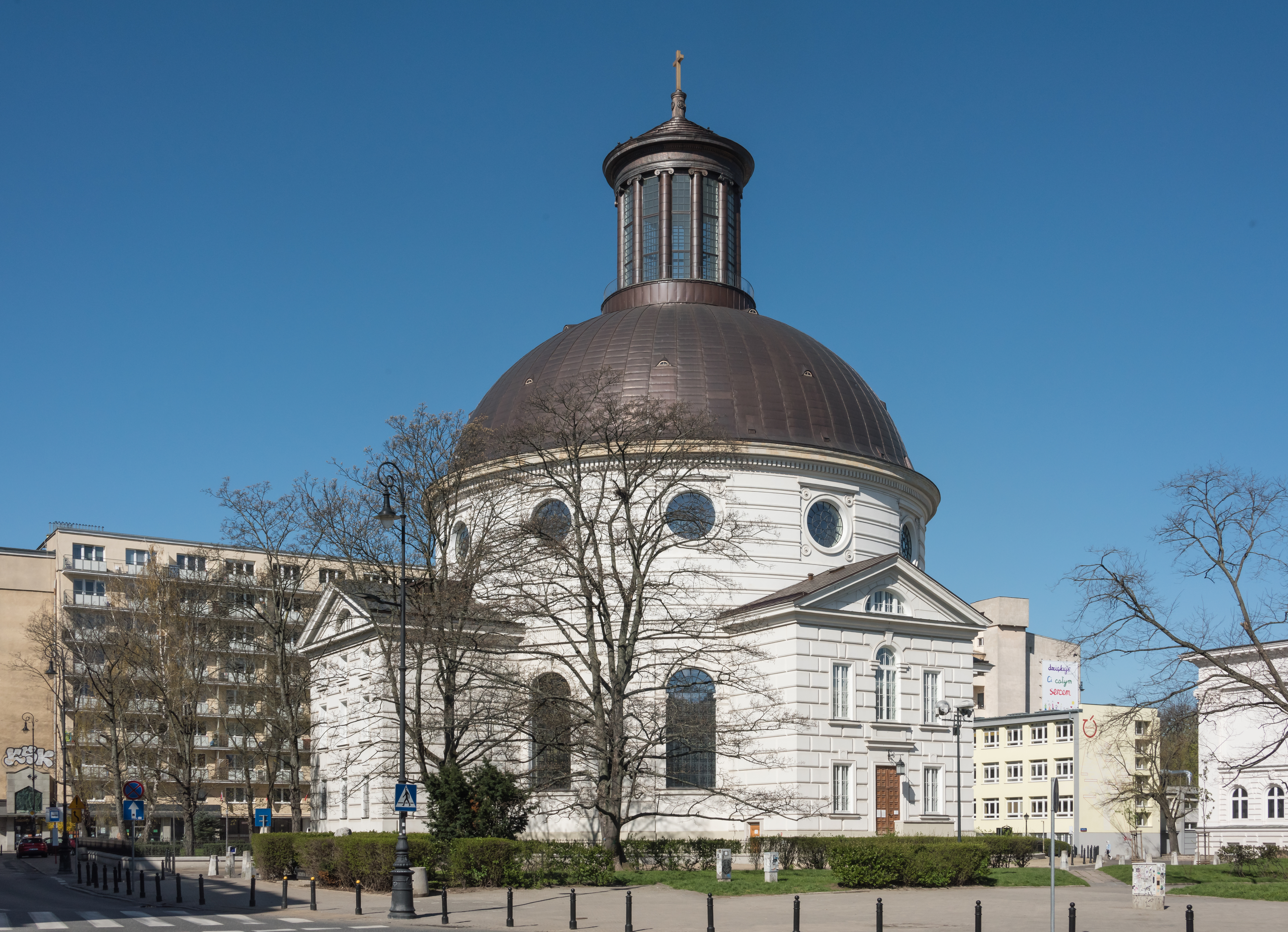
Holy Trinity Church, Warsaw

- Holy Trinity Church, Warsaw, designed by Szymon Bogumił Zug, is completed.
- Havana Cathedral is consecrated.
- Hôtel de Mademoiselle de Condé town house in Paris, designed by Alexandre-Théodore Brongniart, is completed (approximate date).
- Hôtel de Salm town house in Paris, designed by Pierre Rousseau, is built.
- Amphithéâtre Anglais in Paris opened.
- Royal Swedish Opera in Stockholm, designed by Carl Fredrik Adelcrantz, is opened.
- Frankfurter National-Theater in Frankfurt in Hesse, designed by Johann Andreas Hardt Lieb, is opened.
- Nottingham General Hospital in England, designed by John Simpson, is opened to patients.
- Kurfürstlicher Pavillon at Schönbusch (Aschaffenburg) in Bavaria, designed by Emanuel Herigoyen, is completed.
- Lohn Estate house in the Swiss canton of Bern is designed by Carl Ahasver von Sinner.
- Oxenfoord Castle in Scotland is rebuilt to designs by Robert Adam.

== Events ==
- May 6 – Construction of Grand Palace and Front Palace in Bangkok begins.

== Awards ==
- Grand Prix de Rome, architecture: Pierre Bernard.

== Births ==
- August 15 – James Smith of Jordanhill, Scottish merchant, antiquarian and architect (died 1867)
- Kazimierz Jelski, Polish architect and sculptor (died 1867)

== Deaths ==
- January 4 – Ange-Jacques Gabriel, French architect (born 1698)
- June 18 – John Wood, the Younger, English architect working in Bath (born 1728)
- June 26 – Antonio Visentini, Venetian architect, painter and engraver (born 1688)
