= Fragrant Hills =

Park in Haidian District, Beijing, China

- Fragrant Hills Park, Xiangshan Park
- 香山公园
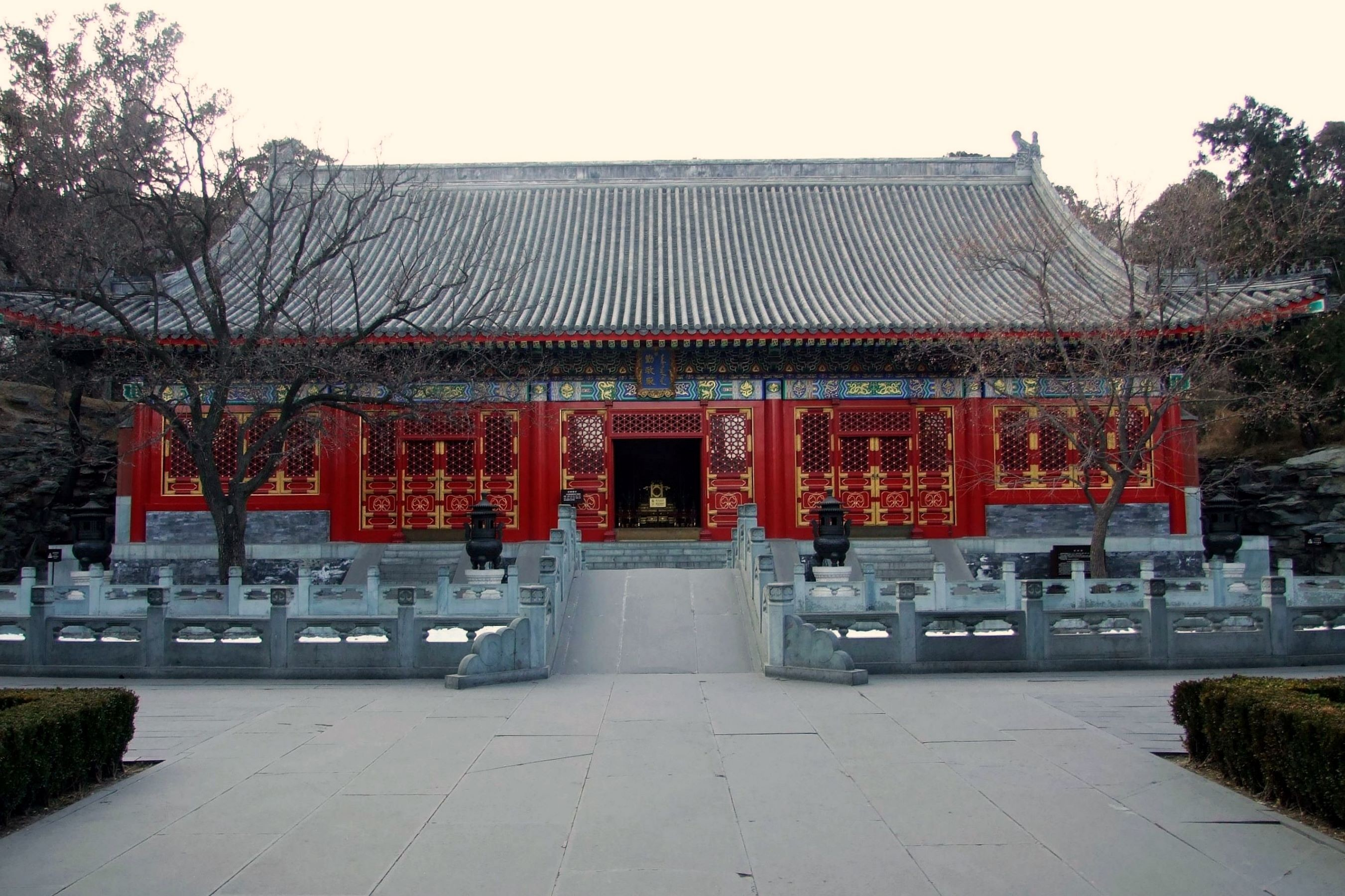
- Palace hall sitting at top of Fragrant Hills

- Location within Beijing
- Type: Urban park, Forest park
- Location: Haidian District, Beijing, China
- Coordinates: 39°59′27.59″N 116°10′46.89″E
- Area: 188 hectares (460 acres)
- Created: 3rd century (in the record); 1186 (officially built); 1441 (rebuilt); 1956 (as public park)
- Owner: Beijing Municipal Administration Center of Parks
- Status: Open all year

Fragrant Hills
- Simplified Chinese: 香山公园
- Literal meaning: Fragrant Hills Park
Transcriptions
Standard Mandarin
- Hanyu Pinyin: Xiāngshān Gōngyuán
- Wade–Giles: Hsiang-shan Kung-yüan

Fragrant Hills Park or Xiangshan Park (香山公园) is a public park and former imperial garden at the foot of the Western Hills in the Haidian District, Beijing, China. It was also formerly known as Jingyi Garden or "Jingyiyuan" (靜宜園). It covers 160 ha (395 acres) and consists of a natural pine-cypress forest, hills with maple trees, smoke trees and persimmon trees, as well as landscaped areas with traditional architecture and cultural relics. The name derives from the highest peak of Fragrant Hills, Xianglu Feng (Incense Burner Peak), a 575-meter (1,886 ft) hill with two large stones resembling incense burners at the top.

== Name ==
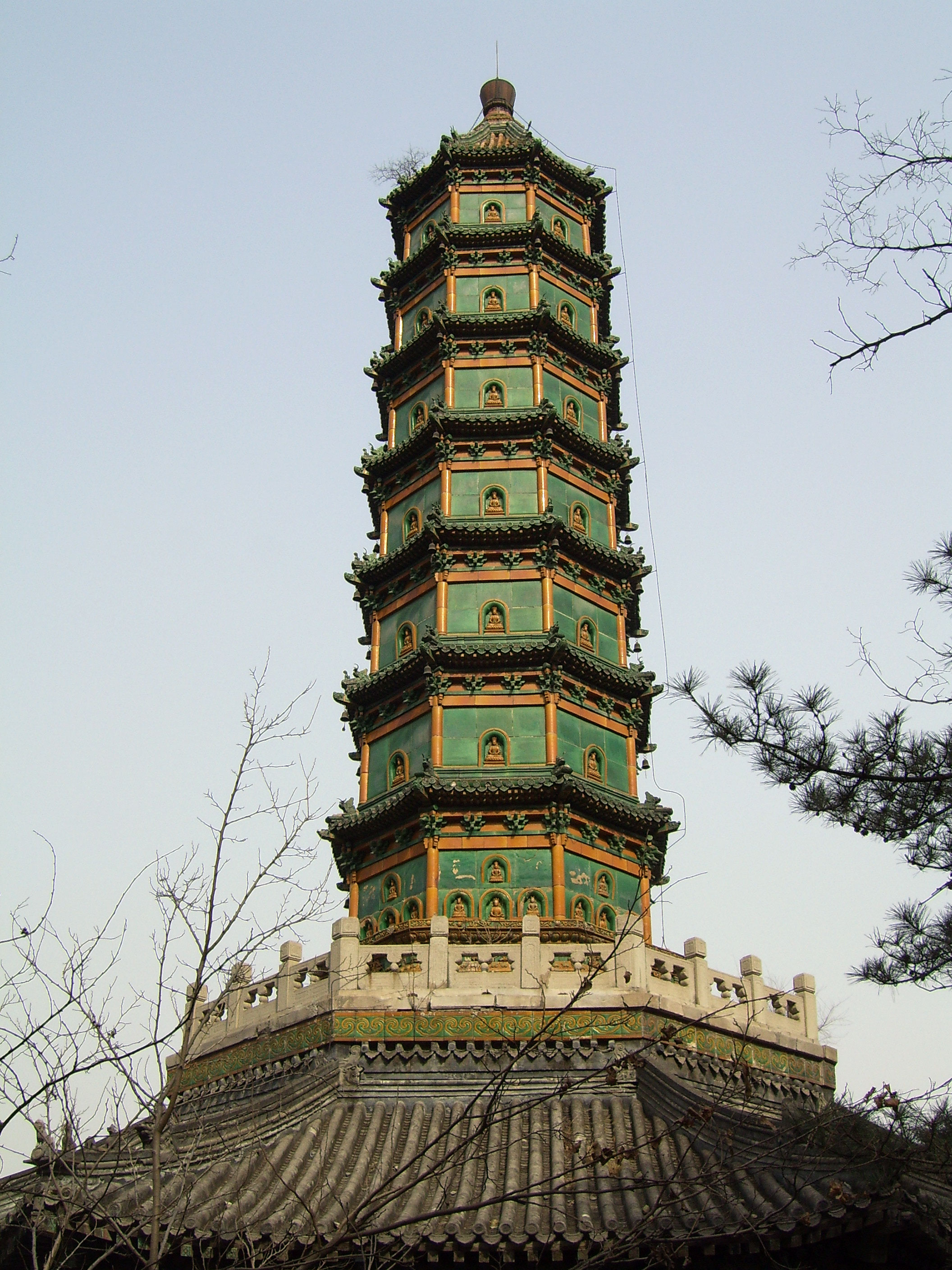
Fragrant Hills Pagoda, built in 1780; although foreign forces burned down the surrounding monastery in 1900, the pagoda survived the fires.

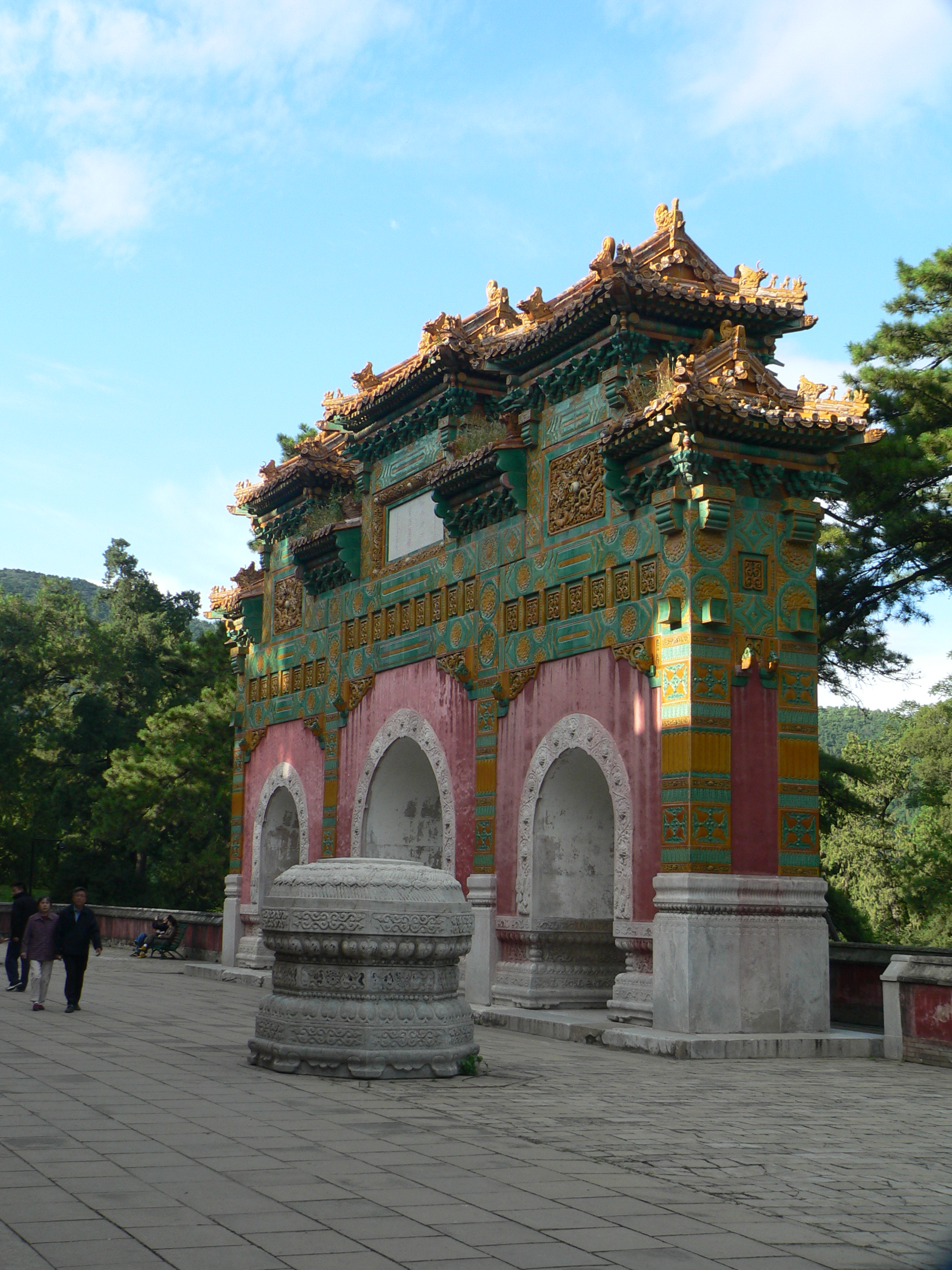

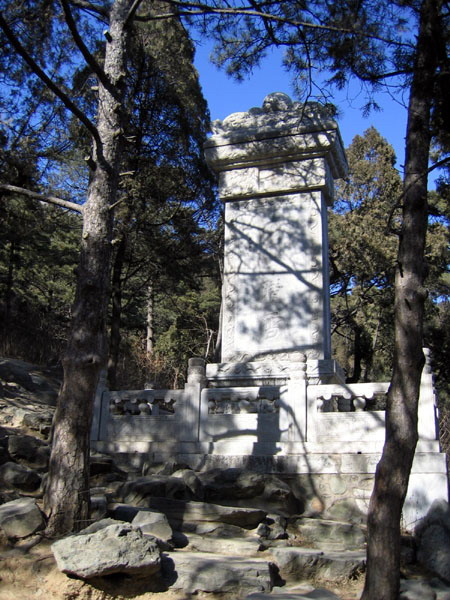

The syllable xiang in the Fragrant Hills' Chinese name Xiangshan refers to incense, not fragrance per se. This name is perhaps derived from the name of the highest peak Xianglu Feng (香炉峰, lit. 'Incense-burner Peak'). The bronze-cast incense burner (with remote roots in ritual bronzes) being a common article found in temples. Indeed, incense was also often used as a metonym for temples.

== History ==
The park was built in 1186, during the rule of the Jin dynasty, and was expanded during the Yuan and Ming dynasties. In 1745, the Qianlong Emperor of the Qing dynasty ordered the addition of several new halls, pavilions and gardens to the park, renaming it the "Garden of Tranquility and Pleasure". In 1860, British and French forces burnt the Old Summer Palace during the Second Opium War, which caused extensive damage to the park. During the Boxer Rebellion, activities by troops of the Eight-Nation Alliance led to further damage to the park. Since 1949, the government of China has been engaged in continuous restoration and development in the area.

The Fragrant Hills park is recognized as one of the major tourist attractions in Beijing. When autumn arrives, the natural scenery in the park turns spectacular, with fiery red smoke tree leaves covering the mountain side. Every year, thousands of tourists ride the cable cars through the park in order see the hills in autumn colors. The grand opening of the annual Red Leaf Festival of Beijing takes place there. There is also the Fragrant Hills Hotel, designed by I. M. Pei, which is more traditional than most of his designs.

== Routes ==
There are two main routes through the park. One route goes through the north area, with Spectacles Lake (Yanjing Lake) and the bridge, Study of Reading Heart (Jianxin Zhai) and Bright Temple (Zhao Miao). Study of Reading Heart was built in the Ming dynasty (1368 to 1644) and is a landscaped park inside Fragrant Hills Park. Bright Temple is a large Tibetan style lamasery complex built in 1780 as the residence for the sixth Panchen Lama during his visits to the Qianlong Emperor. Buildings in the complex have partially been burned down. Among the surviving treasures are a majestic glazed-tiled archway in front of the complex, a terrace and a glazed-tiled pagoda. Bells hung on the eaves of the pagoda chime in breeze.

The second route leads through the south area of the park. Main attractions along the route include Tranquility Green Lake (Jingcui Lake), Shuangqing Villa, Fragrant Temple, and Incense Burner Peak. This route is more difficult because it leads across the highest peak, Incense Burner Peak.

Another point of interest in the park is the Shuangqing Villa, once the residence of Mao Zedong and also an early site for the headquarters of the Central Committee of the Chinese Communist Party.

The Temple of Azure Clouds (Biyun Si) is located just outside the north gate of Fragrant Hills Park.

== Transport ==
- Fragrant Hills station
