= Dajue Temple =

Buddhist temple in Beijing, China

Coordinates: 40°03′05″N 116°05′58″E

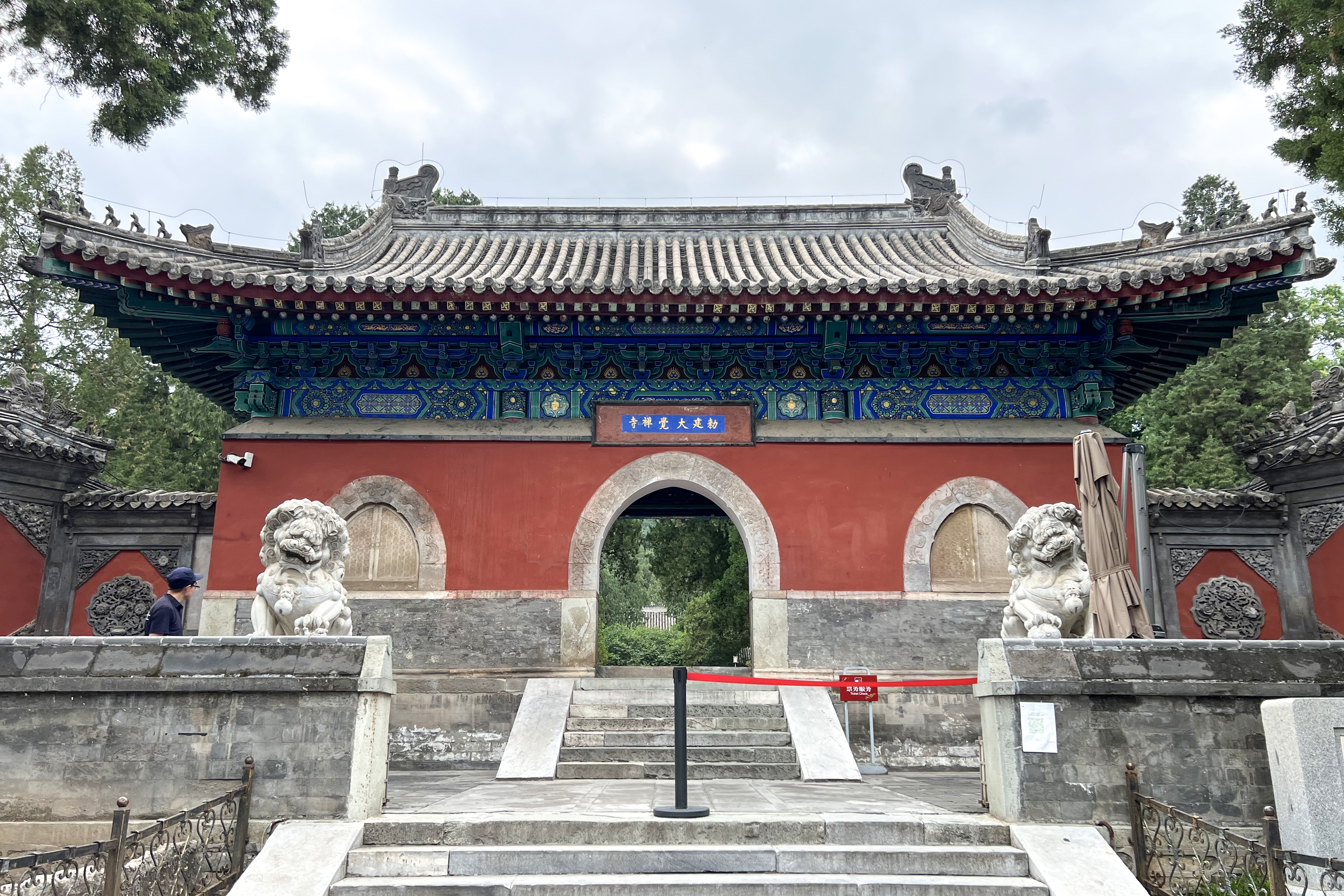
- The Main Gate of Dajue Temple

Religion
- Affiliation: Buddhist

Location
- Location: Beijing
- Interactive map of Dajue Temple

Architecture
- Completed: 15th century Ming dynasty

The Dajue Temple (simplified Chinese: 大觉寺; traditional Chinese: 大覺寺; pinyin: Dàjué Sì; lit. 'Great Awakening Temple/Temple of Enlightenment') is a Buddhist temple located in the Haidian District of western Beijing, China. It was founded in the 11th century, and the current temple dates to a reconstruction in the 15th century during the Ming dynasty. It contains three main halls, a gate, a pagoda and various side halls.

== History ==
According to a stele at the temple, Dajue Temple was first built in 1068 during the Liao dynasty and called Qingshui (Clear Water) Temple, after a stream that ran through the temple grounds. It was later renamed Lingquan Temple, and after being rebuilt in 1428 during the Ming dynasty, was given its present name, "Dajue Temple." The temple went through renovations in 1720 and 1747.

== Layout ==
The temple is arranged on an east–west axis, and contains five main buildings. Beginning at the east is the main gate followed by the Mahavira hall, the Amitabha Hall, the Sarira pagoda and finally the Longwang Hall, a building originally used to store sutras.

=== Mahavira Hall ===
The Mahavira hall contains three large statues dating from the Ming dynasty. The central one is of Sakyamuni, the left one is the Buddha of Medicine and right is Amitabha. Behind these three statues, facing the back exit of the hall, is a statue of Samatabhadra. On each side of the hall are statues of twenty devas. On the wall behind these devas is a mural that dates from the Qing dynasty. There is a large dragon carved into the ceiling.

Statues of the Four Heavenly Kings of Dajue Temple

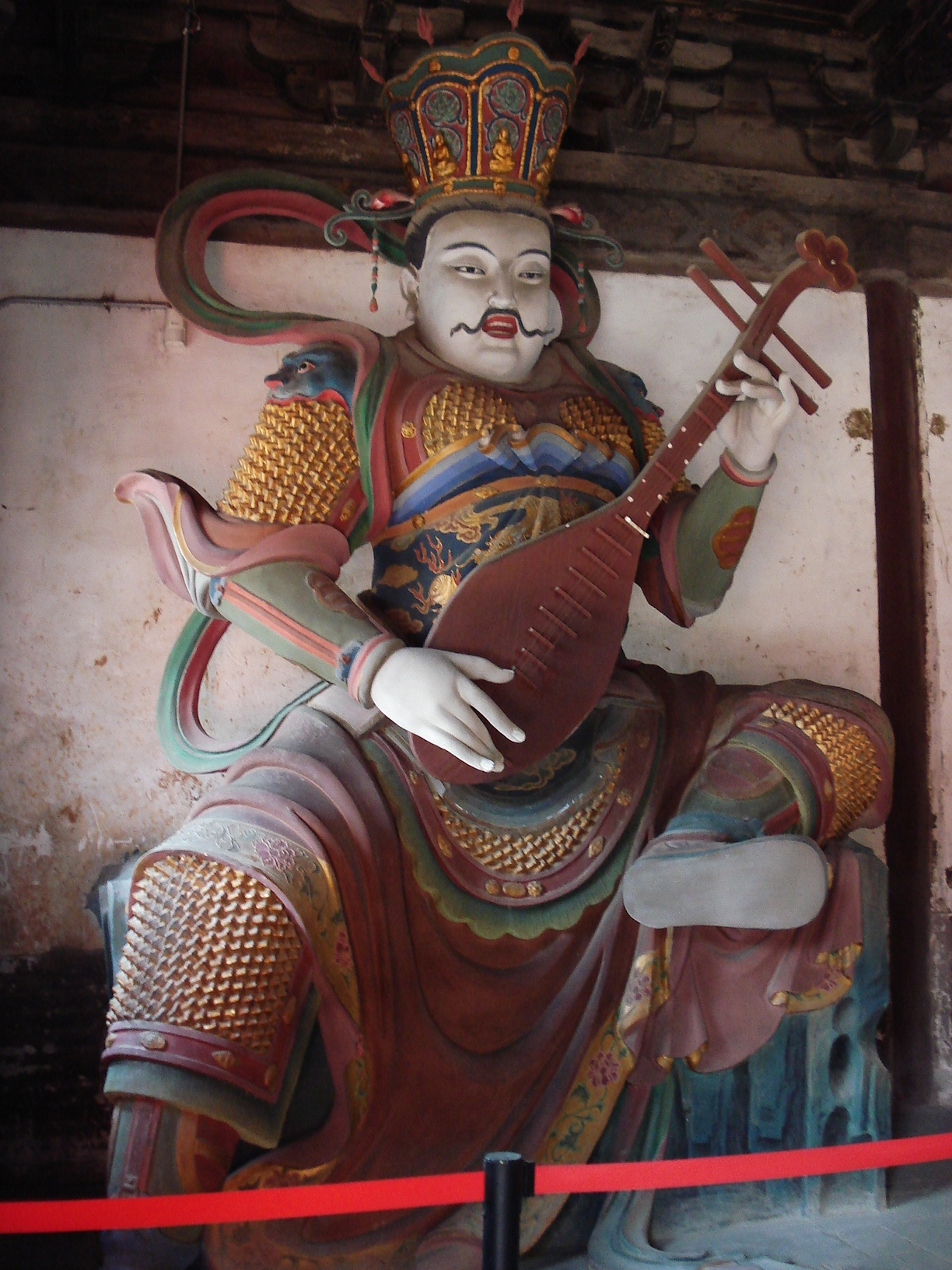
Chiguotian

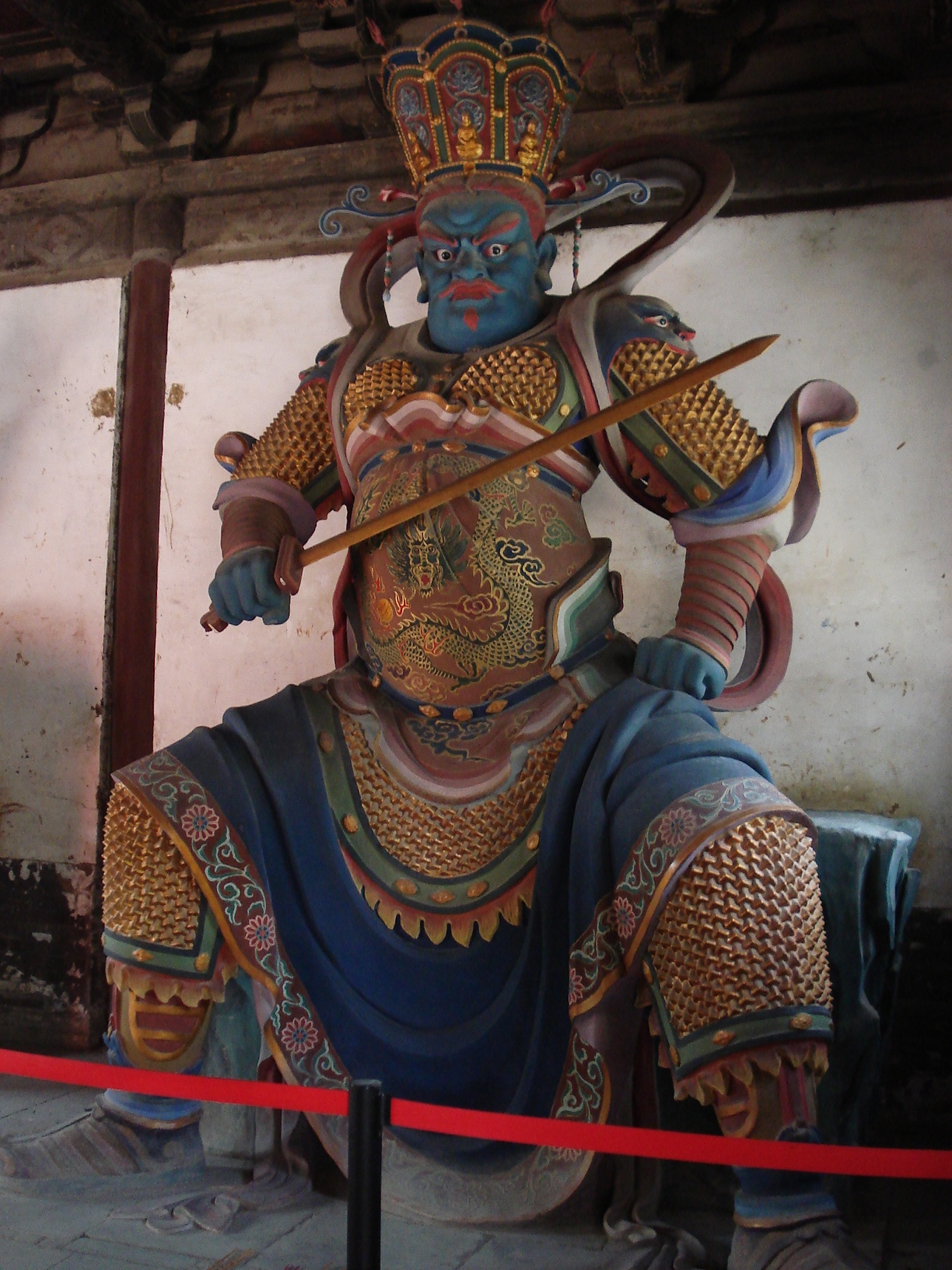
Zengzhangtian

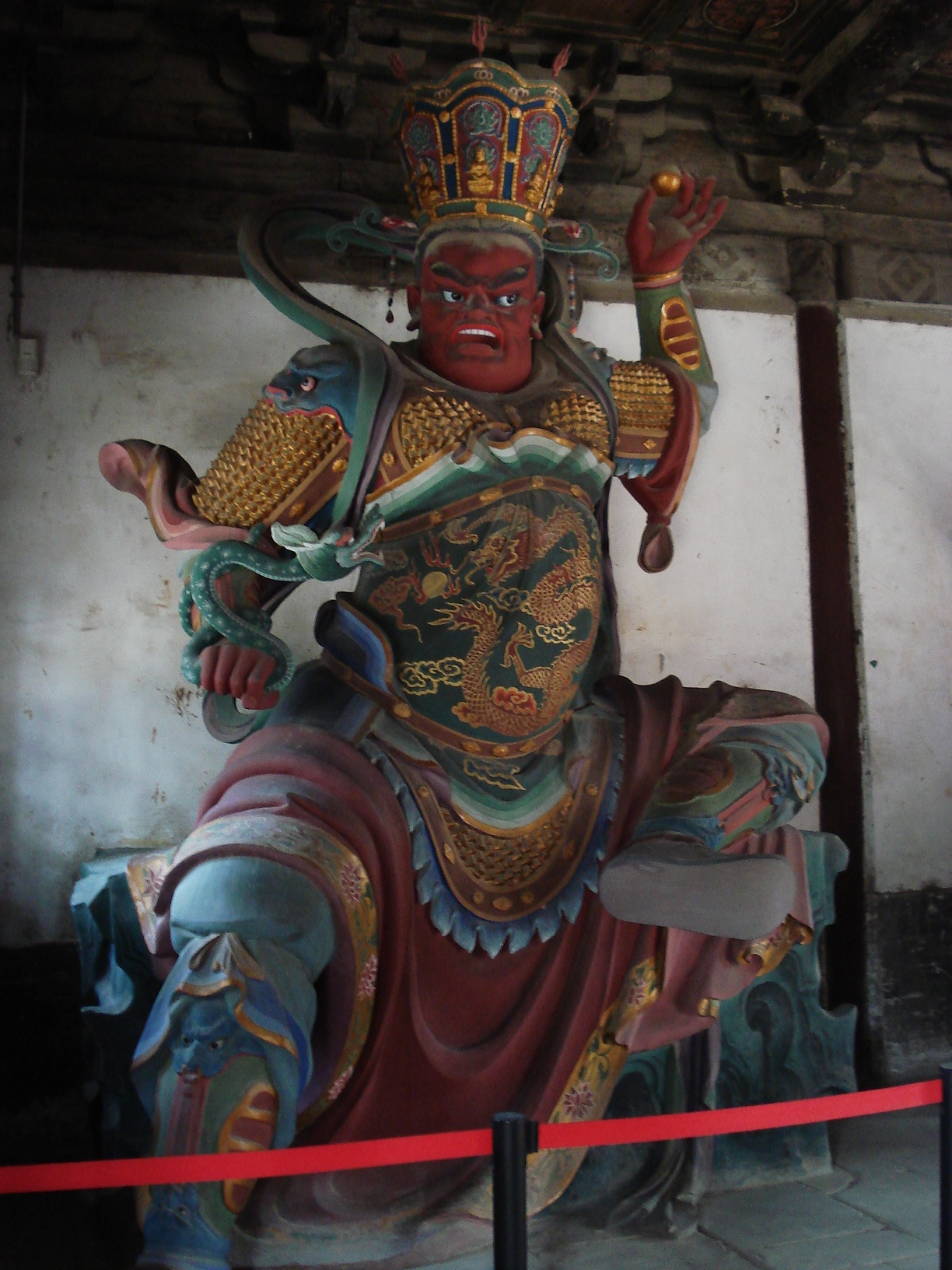
GUangmutian

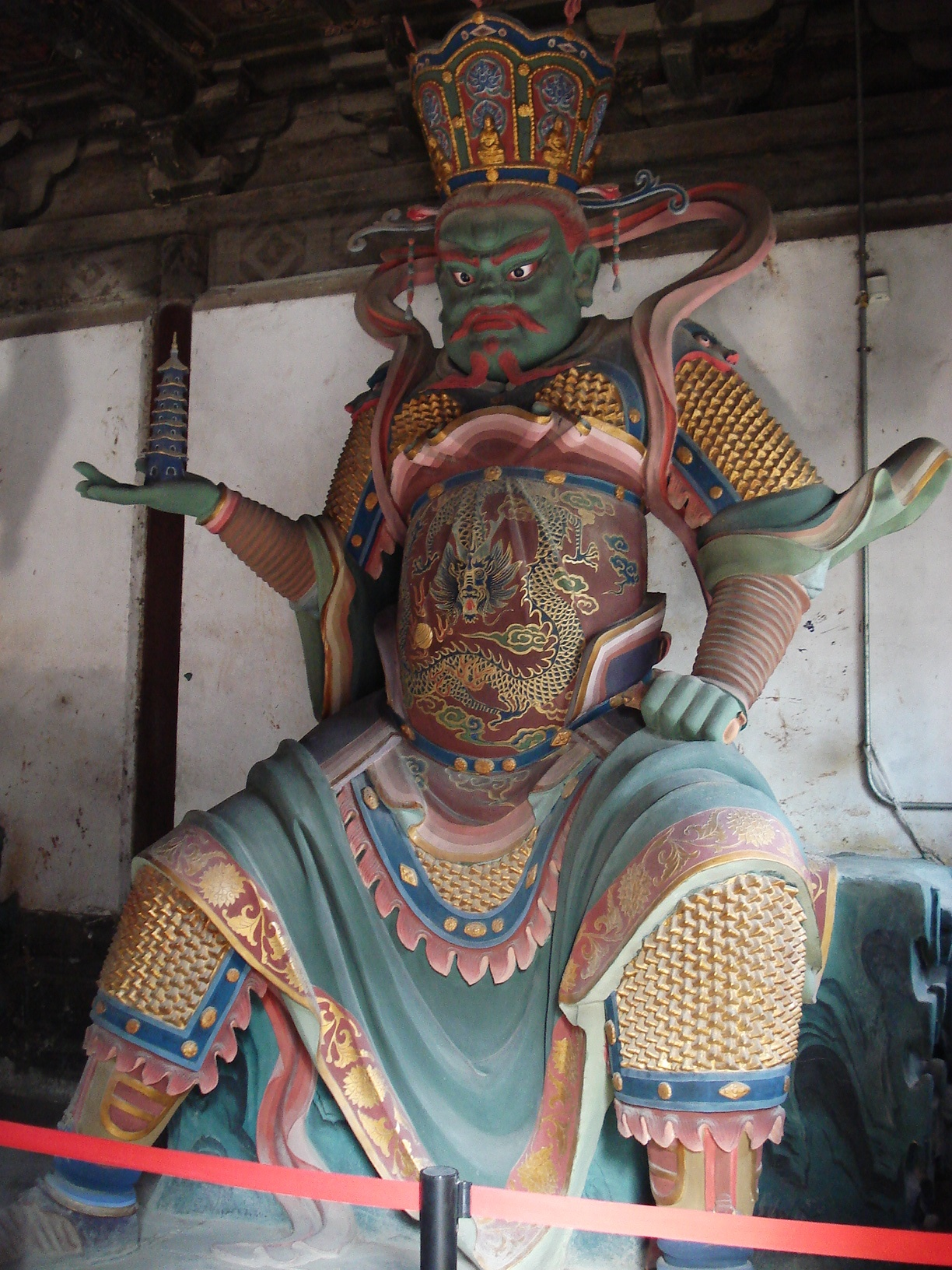
Duowentian

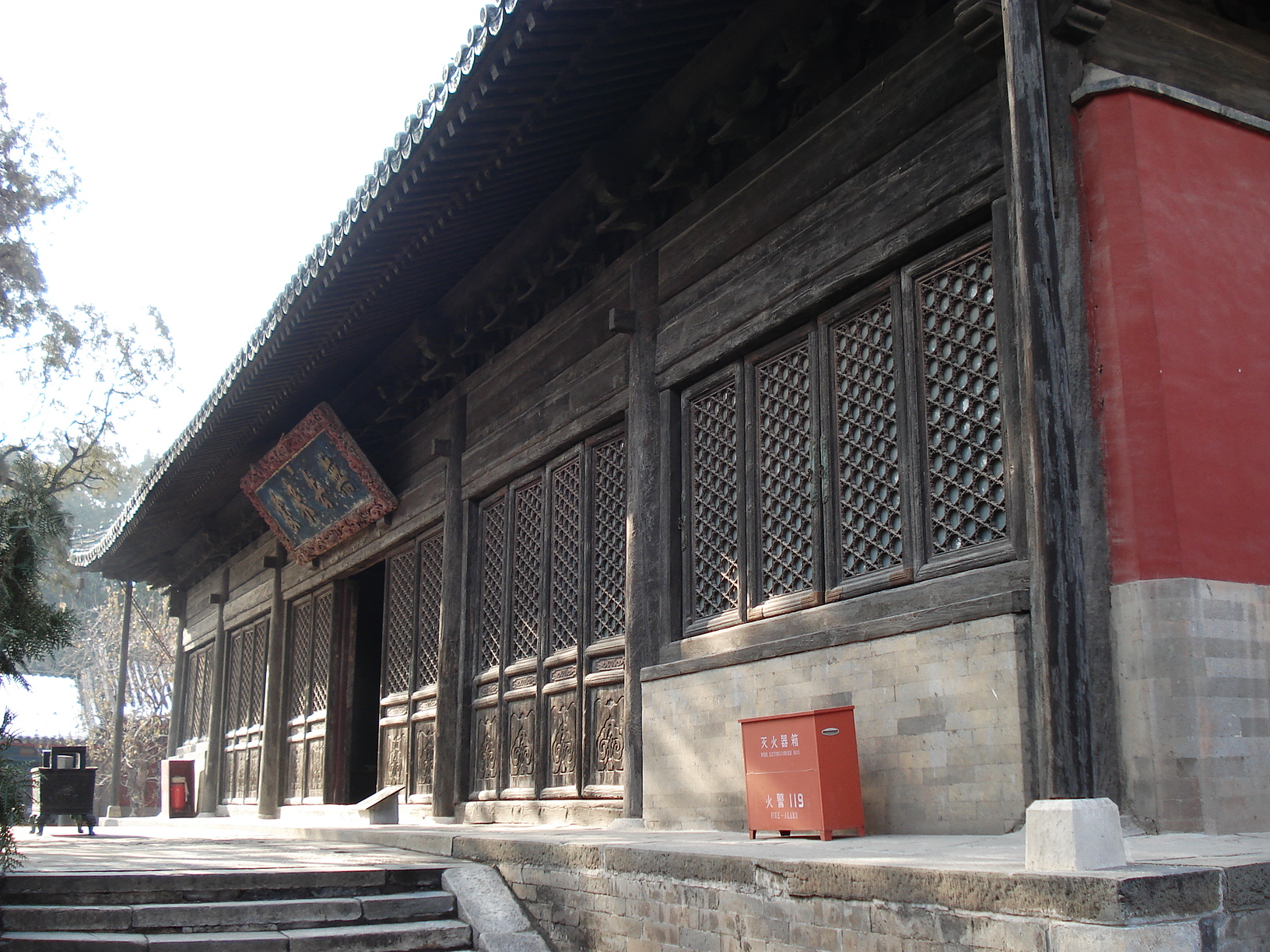
The Mahavira hall of Dajue Temple

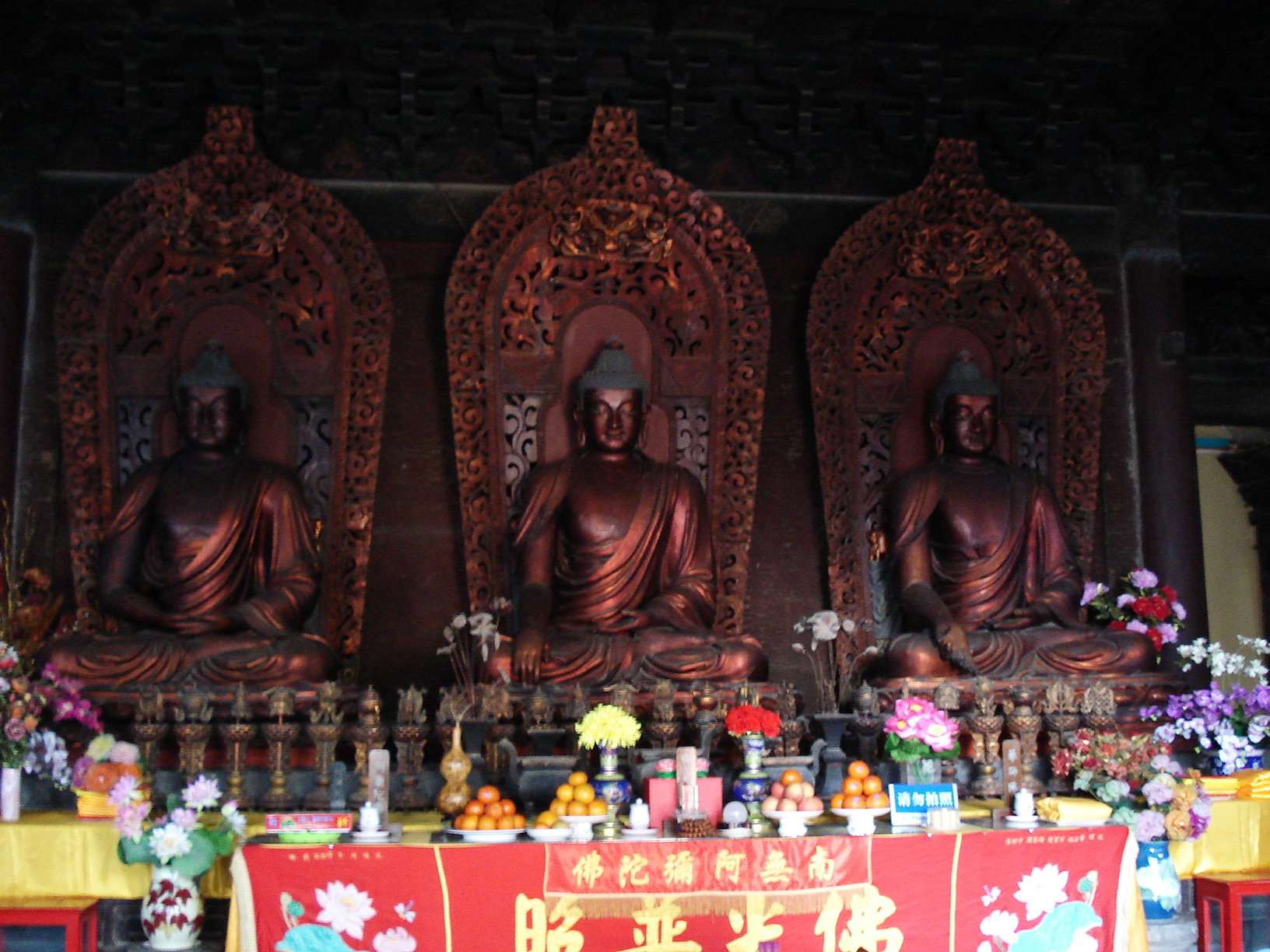
Three statues in the Mahavira hall (Amitabha, Sakyamuni, Buddha of Medicine)

=== Amitabha Hall ===
The Amitabha hall contains a large statue of Guanyin which is flanked by two Bodhisattva statues. Behind the statues, facing the back entrance, there is a Qing-era flying statue.

=== Sarira Pagoda ===
The Sarira pagoda contains the relics of the monk Jialing, who was abbot of the temple for a few years in the 1720s. It was built shortly after his death in 1728. The bottom part of the pagoda is an octagon, while the middle part is white and circular. The pagoda tapers out into a slender spire.
