= Tollyn Twitchell =

American architect (1928–2019)

- Born: Tollyn J. Twitchell; October 2, 1928; Sarasota, Florida, US
- Died: November 3, 2019 (aged 91); Gambier, Ohio
- Education: Massachusetts Institute of Technology
- Occupation: Architect
- Spouses: 1952 Anne (née) Stinson; 1980 Robina (née) Magee
- Children: 6
- Parent(s): Ralph Twitchell (father), Lucien Nielsen (mother)
- Buildings: Zigzag House

Tollyn J. Twitchell (October 2, 1928 - November 3, 2019) was a 20th-century architect who designed buildings for Twitchell Architects. He designed the Carousel House, the ZigZag House, the Sailor Circus arena, Unitarian Universalist Church of Sarasota, Gulf Gate Elementary School, and the Jefferson Center.

== Early life ==
Tollyn was born in Sarasota, Florida October 2, 1928. He attended the Out-of-Door Academy. From 1943 to 1947, he then attended The Hotchkiss School, Lakeville, Connecticut. In 1953 he graduated from MIT where he studied architecture.

== Career ==
After graduation he partnered with his father's architectural firm. Soon after he founded his own firm Twitchell and Allen Architects-Planners, PA. Later he founded The Twitchell Group Architects, PA.

== Designs ==
In 1959 He designed a home with a unique roofline called the “Zigzag House” in Sarasota Florida. The house was designed for philanthropist Rita Adler. The Zigzag House is seen as an "emblem of the Sarasota School of Architecture." Tollyn Twitchell's father, Ralph Twitchell, is considered the founder of the Sarasota School of Architecture.

He designed the Unitarian Universalist Church of Sarasota in 1961. Twitchell designed the building but his father, Ralph Twitchell, approved the plans.

== Personal life ==
In 1952 he was married to Anne (née) Stinson and they had five children. He later married Robina (née) Magee and they had a son.
