= Fragrant Hills Pagoda =

Pagoda in Beijing, China

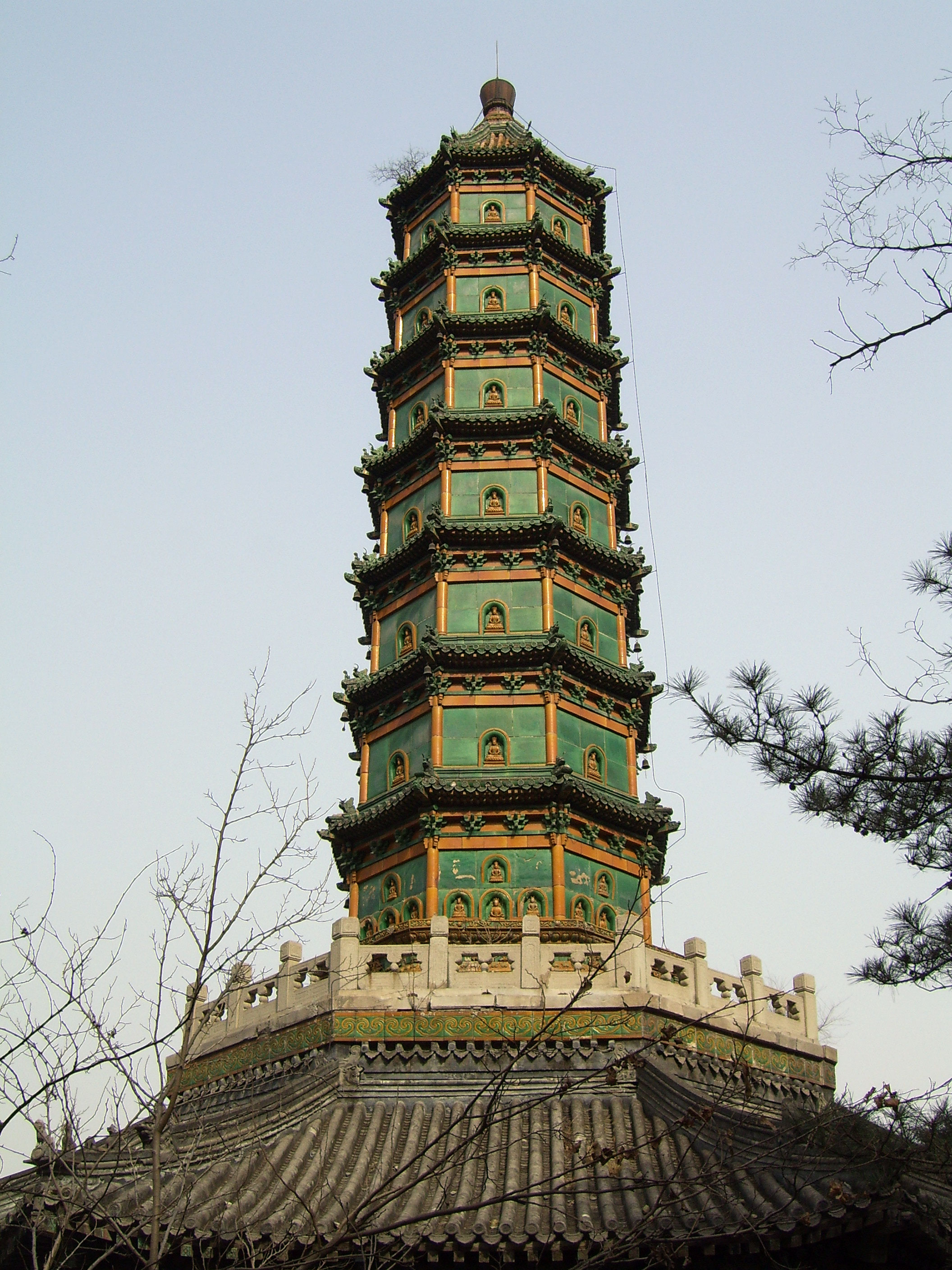
The Fragrant Hills Pagoda

The Fragrant Hills Pagoda (Chinese: 香山琉璃塔; pinyin: Xiāngshān Liúlí Tǎ) of the Fragrant Hills in Beijing, China was built in 1780 during the reign of the Qianlong Emperor (1735–1796) as part of the Grand Zongjing Monastery. Although the monastery located just north of the pagoda was burned down by the Eight-Nation Alliance in 1900, the Fragrant Hills Pagoda was unharmed by the nearby fires. The pagoda is octagonal-shaped, 40 m (130 ft) tall with seven stories, and has a stone square-platform at the base to support the structure. The pagoda is adorned with glazed tiles of yellow, green, purple, and blue hues. Surrounding the pagoda at the base is a wooden Chinese pavilion with supporting columns, this structure crowned with a white marble railing and terrace.
