= 1799 in architecture =

The year 1799 in architecture involved some significant events.

== Buildings and structures ==
=== Buildings ===
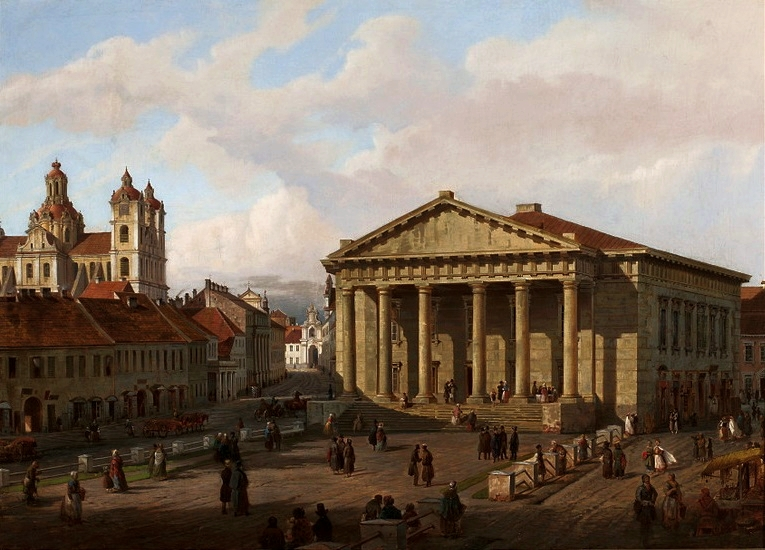
Town Hall, Vilnius

- May 9 – St. Mark's Church in-the-Bowery in New York City, built by John McComb, Jr., is consecrated.
- Gracie Mansion in New York City, designed by John McComb, Jr., is built.
- The Chester Shot Tower, a grade-II*-listed shot tower, is built in the Boughton district of Chester, England.
- In New Orleans, The Cabildo (first phase) is completed (begun in 1795).
- Reconstruction of Town Hall, Vilnius, by Laurynas Gucevičius is completed.
- Broadway Tower, Worcestershire, England, designed by James Wyatt, is completed.
- Grand Pump Room, Bath, England, designed by Thomas Baldwin and John Palmer, is completed
- Hjo Church in Sweden is completed.

== Births ==
- Approximate date – William Thomas, English-born architect working in Canada (died 1860)

== Deaths ==
- February 6 – Étienne-Louis Boullée, French neoclassical architect (born 1728)
- April 17 – Richard Jupp, English architect (born 1728)
- June 11 – Joaquín Toesca, Italian-born architect working in Chile (born 1745)
- August 31 – Nicolas-Henri Jardin, French neoclassical architect (born 1720)
