= 1778 in architecture =

The year 1778 in architecture involved some significant events.

== Events ==
- Ivan Starov draws up a radial urban master plan for the Russian city of Yaroslavl.

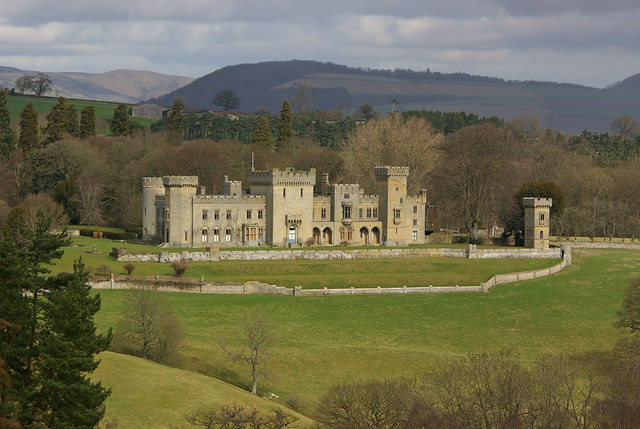
Downton Castle

== Buildings and structures ==
=== Buildings ===
- Denton Hall, Wharfedale, England, designed by John Carr, is completed.
- Reconstruction of Downton Castle, Herefordshire, England by Richard Payne Knight in Gothic Revival style is largely completed.
- Emin Minaret, Turpan, modern-day China, is completed.
- La Scala opera house in Milan (Lombardy), designed by Giuseppe Piermarini, is opened and remodelling of the Royal Palace of Milan by him is largely completed.

== Awards ==
- Grand Prix de Rome, architecture: prize carried over to 1779.

== Births ==
- January 4 – Jean-Antoine Alavoine, French architect (died 1834)
- August 31 – William Wilkins, English architect (died 1839)
- July 3 – Carl Ludvig Engel, Prussian architect working in Finland (died 1840)

== Deaths ==
- November 9 – Giovanni Battista Piranesi, Italian etcher of architectural views (born 1720)
