= 1904 in architecture =

The year 1904 in architecture involved some significant architectural events and new buildings.

== Events ==
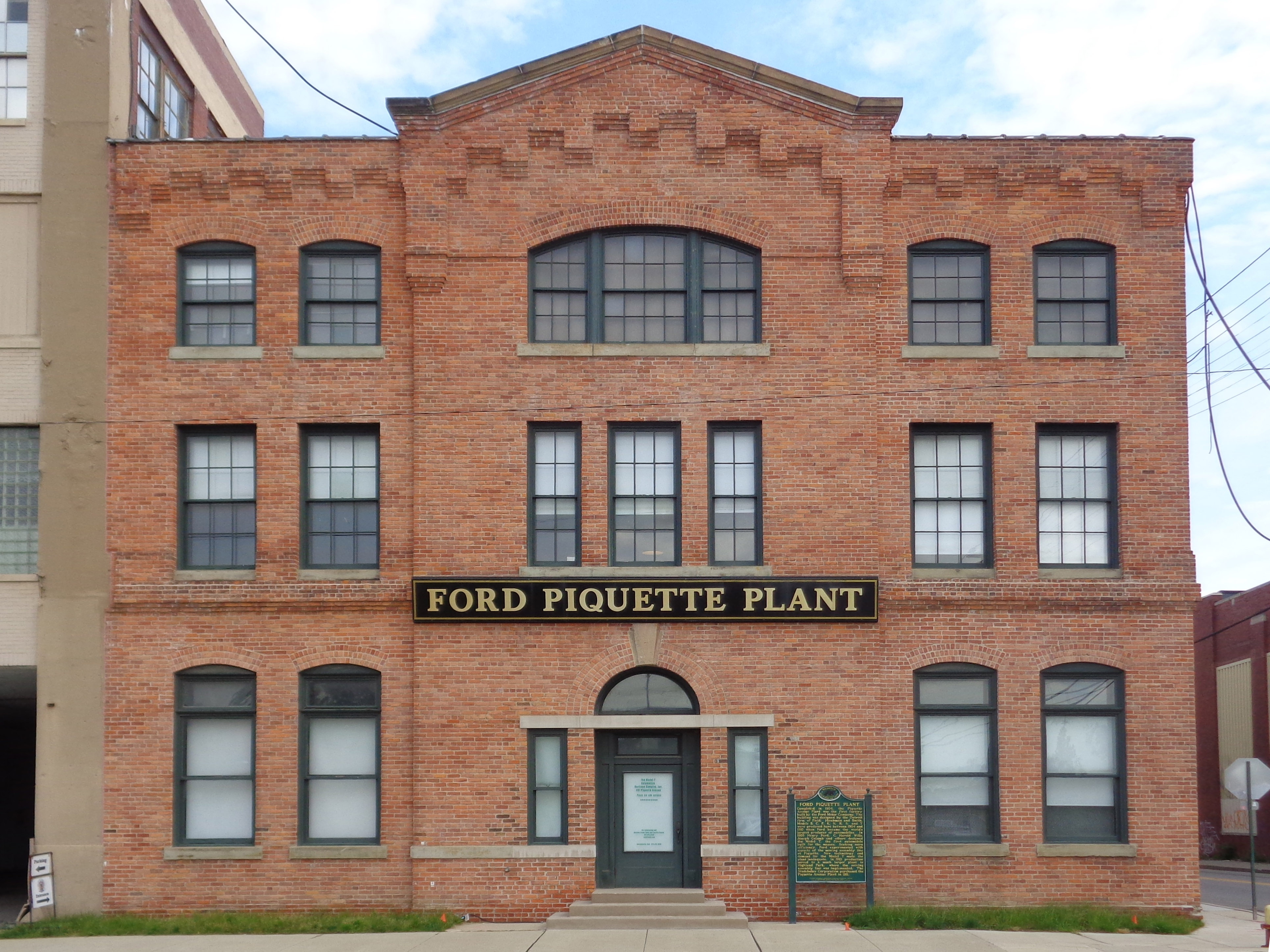
Ford Piquette Avenue Plant, in Detroit, USA

- May – The Ford Motor Company approves construction of the Ford Piquette Avenue Plant, a New England mill-style building in Detroit, Michigan, USA.
- June – Construction work begins on the New York Hippodrome, designed by Frederic Thompson and Jay H. Morgan (demolished 1939).

== Buildings and structures ==
=== Buildings opened ===
- January 8 – Blackstone Library, Chicago, designed by Solon Spencer Beman.
- Spring – Old Faithful Inn in Yellowstone National Park, Wyoming, designed by Robert Reamer.
- April – Watts Gallery in Compton, Guildford, England, designed by Christopher Hatton Turnor.
- May 3 – Midtgulen Church, in Bremanger Municipality, Norway, designed by Lars Sølvberg, is consecrated by Bishop Johan Willoch Erichsen.
- September 4 – St. Regis Hotel in New York City, designed by Trowbridge & Livingston with interiors by Arnold Constable.
- September 17 – New St Columba Church of Scotland, Glasgow, designed by Tennant and Burke.

=== Buildings completed ===
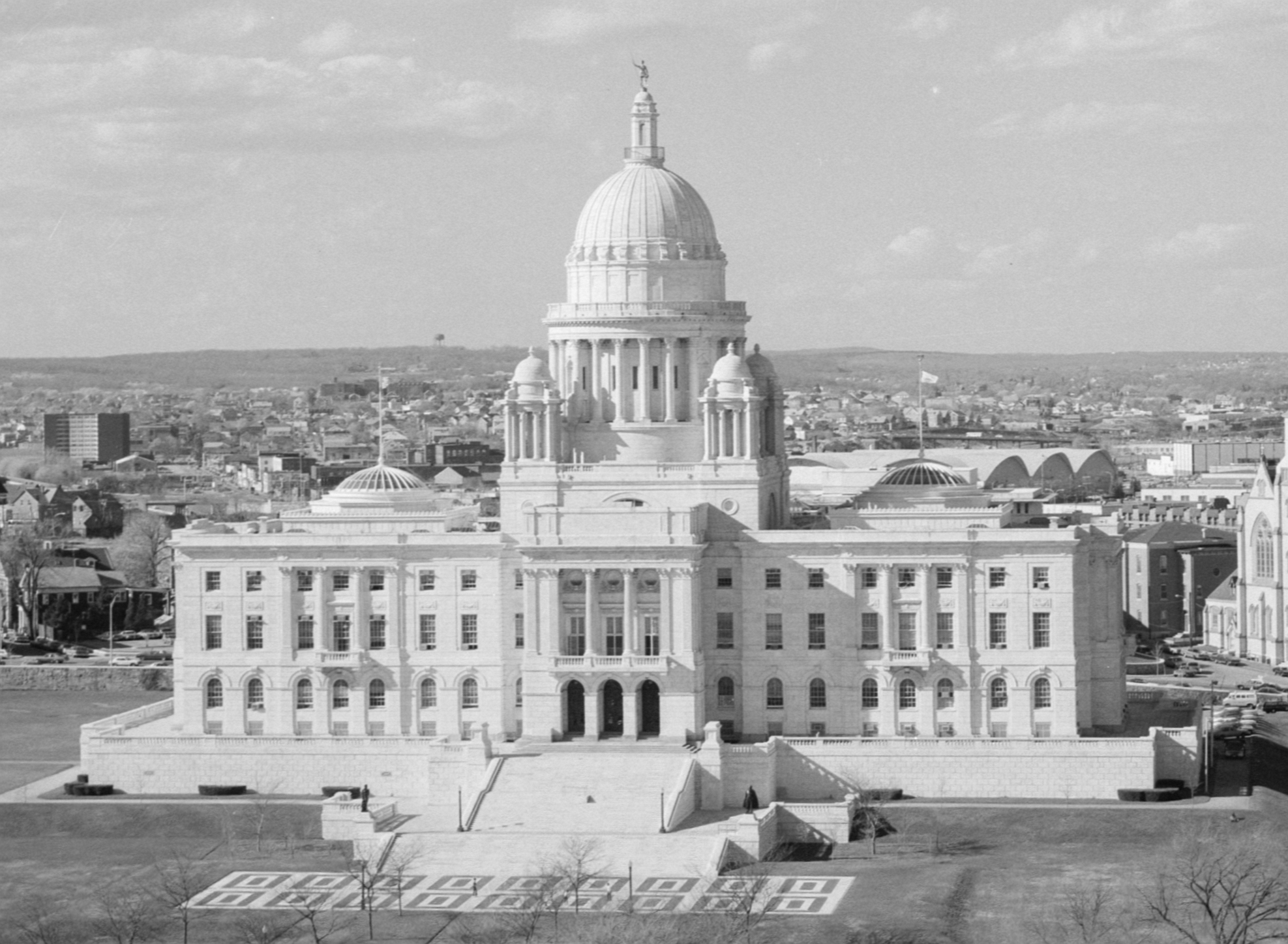
Rhode Island State House in Providence, Rhode Island, USA

- The Rhode Island State House in Providence, Rhode Island, designed by McKim, Mead & White, completed.
- Kaiser-Friedrich-Museum, Berlin, designed by Ernst von Ihne.
- Batumi Synagogue, Georgia, designed by Semyon Vulkovich.
- The Bergeret House in Nancy, France, by Lucien Weissenburger, with ironwork by Louis Majorelle, interior paintings by Victor Prouvé, stained glass by Jacques Gruber and woodwork by Eugène Vallin.
- The Villa des Roches, designed by Émile André as his own house, in the Parc de Saurupt in Nancy, France.
- Larkin Administration Building, designed by Frank Lloyd Wright for the Larkin Soap Company of Buffalo, New York.
- The Mayoralty of Baku, final work of Józef Gosławski.
- Hungarian Parliament Building (Országház) on the Danube in Budapest, designed by Imre Steindl (died 1902).
- Hammersmith Hospital, London, designed by Giles, Gough and Trollope.
- Rue Franklin Apartments, Paris, by Auguste Perret and his brother Gustave, an early example of an exposed reinforced concrete frame building.
- Hôtel Brion, Strasbourg, built by architect Auguste Brion for himself.

== Awards ==
- RIBA Royal Gold Medal – Auguste Choisy.
- Grand Prix de Rome, architecture: Ernest Michel Hébrard.

== Births ==
- February 25 – Sydney Ancher, Australian architect (died 1979)
- March 3 – Donald McMorran, English neo-Georgian architect (died 1965)
- April 18 – Giuseppe Terragni, Italian Rationalist architect (died 1943)
- June 8 – Bruce Goff, American residential architect (died 1982)
- September 11 – Paul Thiry, American architect (died 1993)
- September 29 – Egon Eiermann, German architect (died 1970)
- November 25 – John Summerson, English architectural historian (died 1992)
- December 29 – Hans van der Laan, Dutch monk and architect (died 1991)

== Deaths ==
- March – Peter Paul Pugin, English architect (born 1851)
- October 4 – Frédéric Bartholdi, French sculptor, designer of the Statue of Liberty (born 1834)
