= Idalija Bėčienė =

Lithuanian interior designer and architect

Idalija Bėčienė (born 1953) is a Lithuanian interior designer and architect. She is noted for her work with polychrome, with projects such as Vilnius City Hall (1995–2000), the Lithuanian Presidential Palace and the Great Hall (1998), the Church of Jesus Christ of God and Šešuolėliai Manor. In Vilnius she has also restored a 19th-century villa with Rūta Valainienė and Elena Kazlauskaitė. She is a member of the Lithuanian Chamber of Architects.
