= 1801 in architecture =

The year 1801 in architecture involved some significant events.

== Buildings and structures ==
=== Buildings ===
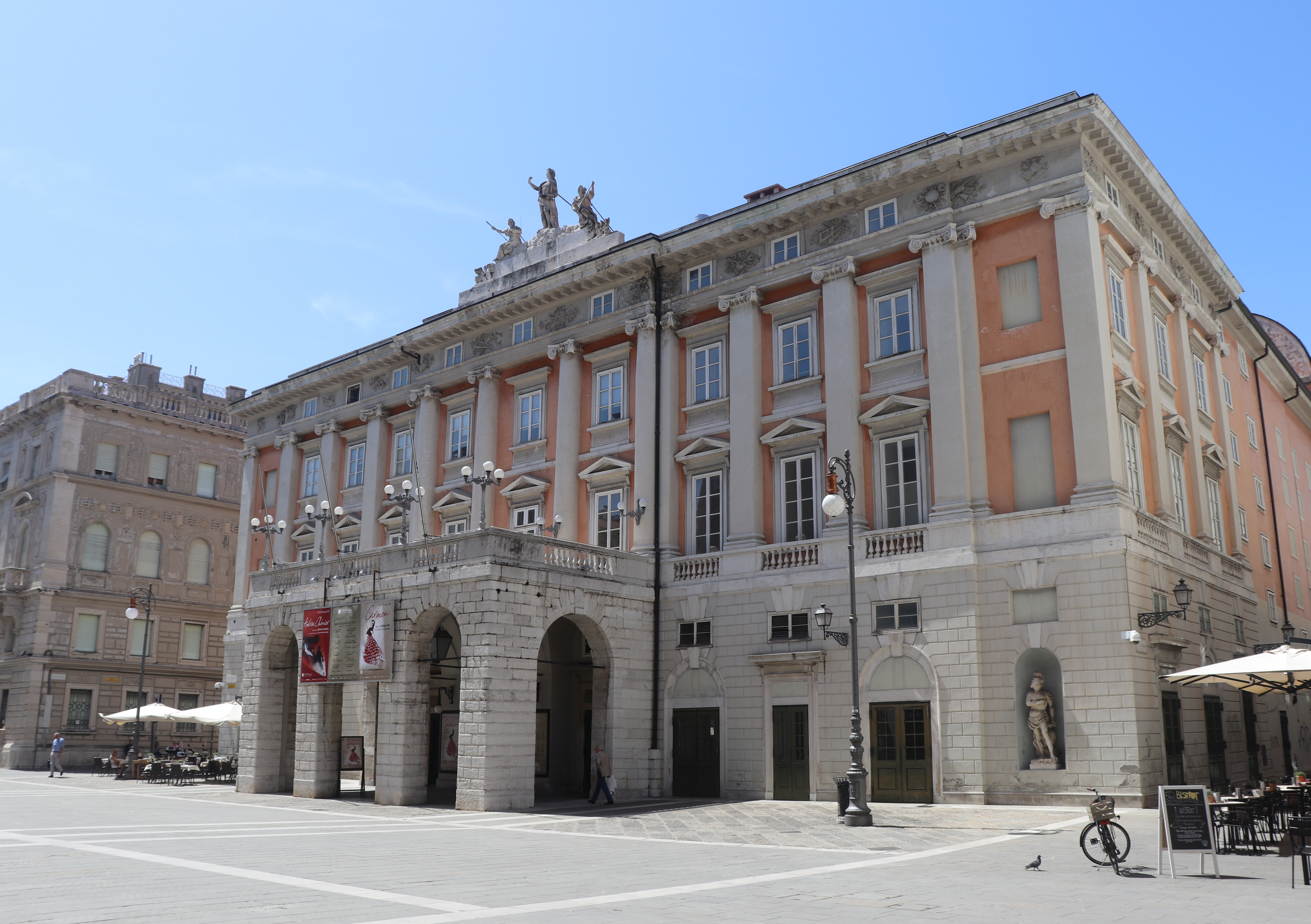
The Teatro Nuovo in Trieste, Italy

- April 21 – The Teatro Nuovo in Trieste, an opera house designed by Gian Antonio Selva (interior) and Matteo Pertsch (exterior), is inaugurated.
- The New London Harbor Lighthouse in New London, Connecticut is completed.

== Awards ==
- Grand Prix de Rome, architecture: (unknown).

== Births ==
- May 11 – Henri Labrouste, French architect of the École des Beaux Arts (died 1875)
- June 4 – James Pennethorne, English architect and planner working in London (died 1871)
- June 5 – William Scamp, English architect working in Malta (died 1872)
- date unknown – John Semple, Irish architect (died 1882)

== Deaths ==
- September 6 – William Tyler, sculptor and architect, co-founder of the Royal Academy (born 1728)
