= 1875 in architecture =

The year 1875 in architecture involved some significant events.

== Buildings and structures ==
=== Buildings ===
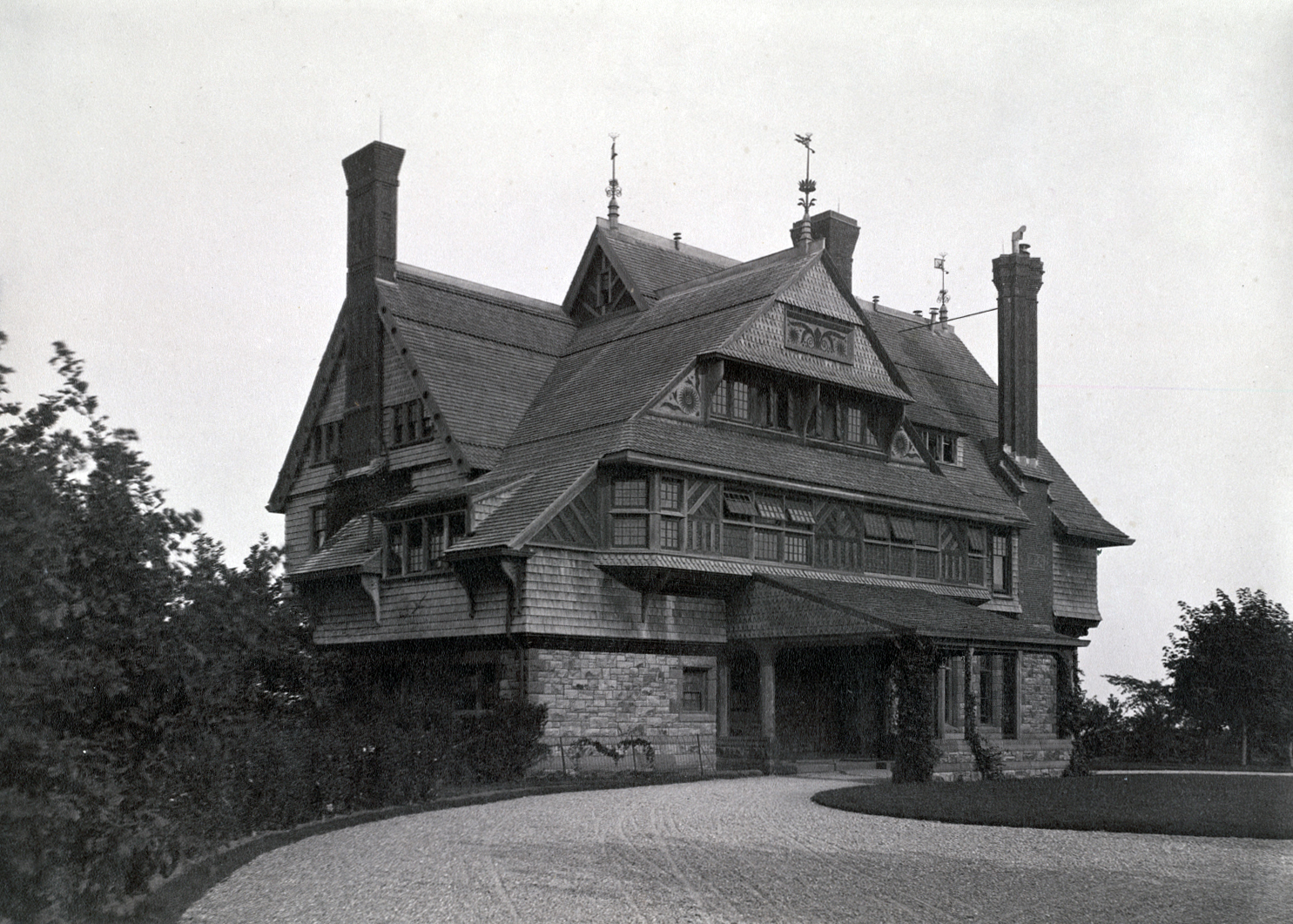
William Watts Sherman House as built

- January 5 – Palais Garnier, home of the Paris Opera in France, designed by Charles Garnier, opens.
- June 13 – Sage Chapel at Cornell University, designed by Charles Babcock, holds opening services.
- Congregational Chapel, Wellingborough, England, designed by Edward Sharman and Caleb Archer, is completed.
- Sydney Town Hall in Sydney, Australia is completed.
- William Watts Sherman House, Newport, Rhode Island, designed by Henry Hobson Richardson, is built.
- The Hermannsdenkmal monument in Berlin, Germany, designed by sculptor Ernst von Bandel, is completed.
- Cize–Bolozon viaduct opens to rail traffic across the Ain in France.

== Awards ==
- RIBA Royal Gold Medal – Edmund Sharpe.
- Grand Prix de Rome, architecture: Edmond Paulin.

== Organisations ==
- German firm Wayss & Freitag formed, who pioneered reinforced concrete.

== Births ==
- May 12 – Charles Holden, English architect noted for London Underground stations (died 1960)
- July – W. Curtis Green, English commercial architect (died 1960)
- August 11 – Percy Erskine Nobbs, Scottish-born Canadian Arts and Crafts architect (died 1964)

== Deaths ==
- February 28 – Robert Willis, English mechanical engineer, phonetician and architectural historian (born 1800)
- June 5 – E. W. Pugin, English ecclesiastical architect (born 1834)
- June 24 – Henri Labrouste, French architect (born 1801)
