= 1800 in architecture =

The year 1800 in architecture involved some significant events.

== Buildings and structures ==
=== Buildings ===
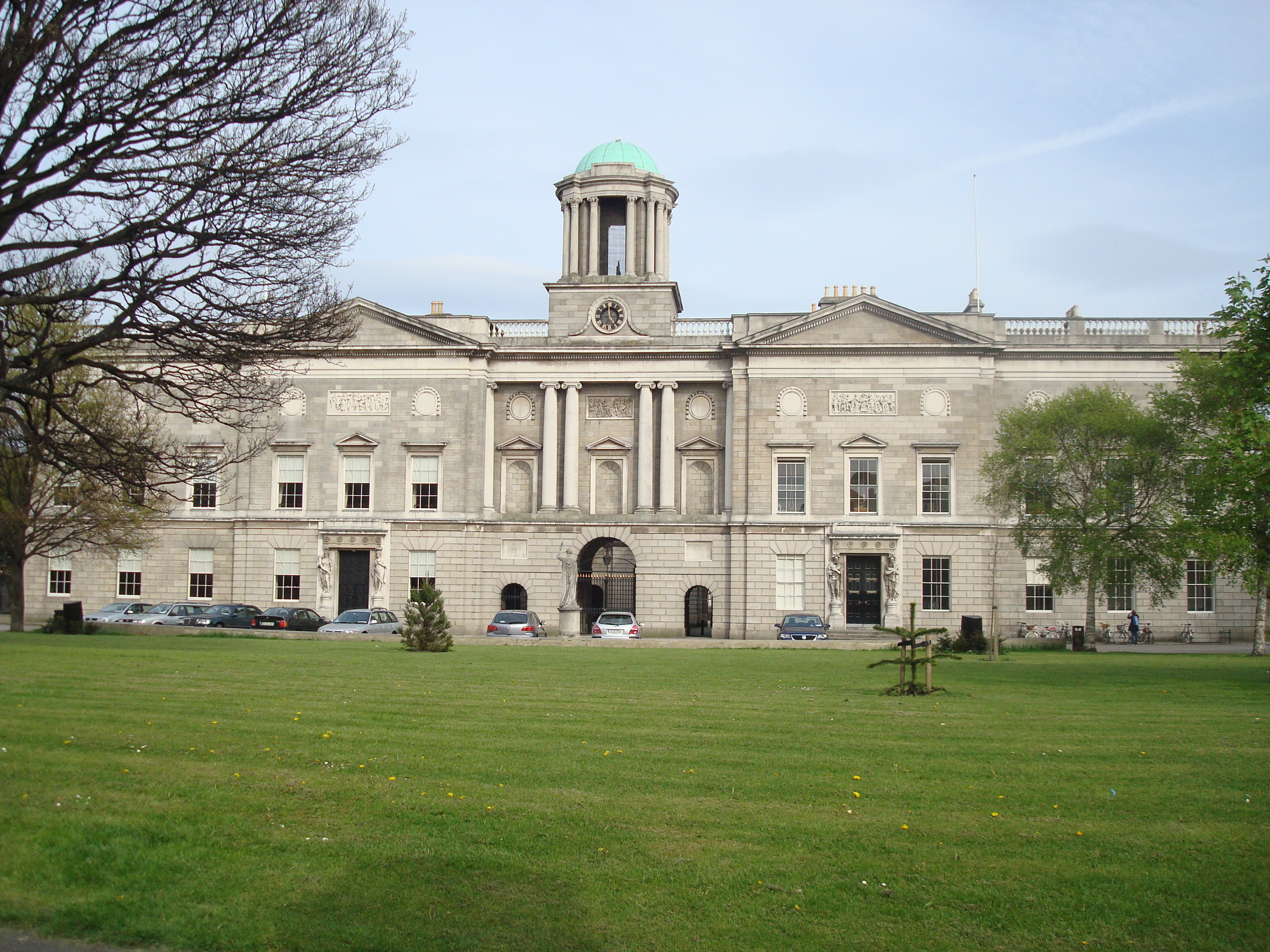
King's Inns, Dublin

- June 30 – Replacement Teatro Riccardi opera house in Bergamo, Lombardy, designed by Giovanni Francesco Lucchini, is opened.
- November 1 – The White House in Washington D.C., United States, is completed. However, the porticoes are not added until 1825.
- The King's Inns in Dublin, designed by James Gandon, are completed.
- Santiago Metropolitan Cathedral in Chile is completed.
- East Cowes Castle on the Isle of Wight, designed by John Nash for his own use, is completed.
- Tyringham Hall near Newport Pagnell in England, designed by John Soane, is completed.
- Gosford House in East Lothian, Scotland, is completed to the 1790 design of Robert Adam (died 1792).

== Publications ==
- Birch's Views of Philadelphia published.

== Awards ==
- Grand Prix de Rome, architecture: Simon Vallot and Jean-François-Julien Mesnager.

== Births ==
- February 27 – Robert Willis, English mechanical engineer, phonetician and architectural historian (died 1875)
- August 17 – Isaiah Rogers, American architect (died 1869)
- September 30 – Decimus Burton, English architect (died 1881)
- December 4 – Louis Dupasquier, French architect (died 1870)

== Deaths ==
- May 21 – Carl August Ehrensvärd, Swedish naval officer, painter, author and neoclassical architect (born 1745)
