= 1834 in architecture =

The year 1834 in architecture involved some significant architectural events and new buildings.

== Events ==
- October 16 – Burning of Parliament: Much of the Palace of Westminster in London is destroyed by fire. Augustus Pugin is among the witnesses.
- The Institute of British Architects in London, predecessor of the Royal Institute of British Architects, is formed.
- First published scholarly description and drawings of a stave church, painter Johannes Flintoe's essay on Heddal Stave Church in Samlinger til det Norske Folks Sprog og Historie (Christiania).

== Buildings and structures ==
=== Buildings opened ===
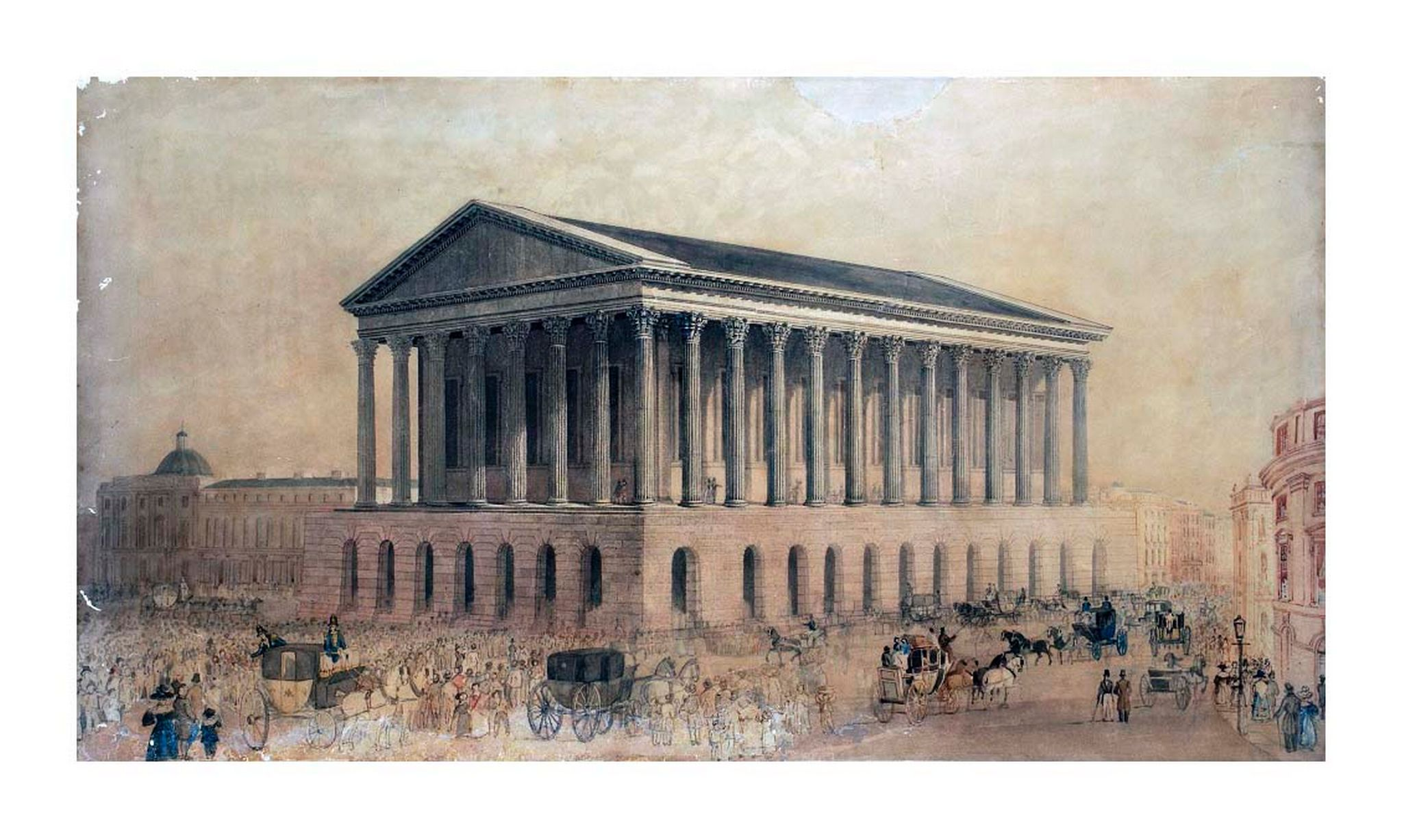
Birmingham Town Hall

- August 30 – The Alexander Column, Saint Petersburg, Russia, designed by Auguste de Montferrand, is unveiled.
- October 7 – Birmingham Town Hall in Birmingham, England, designed by Joseph Hansom and Edward Welch, is opened for the start of the Music Festival, already delayed by a year because of lack of funds.

=== Buildings completed ===
- De Zwaluw, Hoogeveen, smock mill, Netherlands, built for Lucas Quirinus Robaard and Karsjen Meeuwes Steenbergen.
- Gurgi Mosque, Tripoli, Libya.
- Final reconstruction of the Presidential Palace, Vilnius, Lithuania, by Vasily Stasov.
- Reconstruction of the Narva Triumphal Arch in Saint Petersburg in stone by Vasily Stasov.

== Awards ==
- Grand Prix de Rome, architecture: Paul-Eugène Lequeux.

== Births ==
- March 11 – E. W. Pugin, English ecclesiastical architect (d. 1875)
- March 24 – William Morris, English artist, writer and conservationist (d. 1896)
- April 5 – Robert Rowand Anderson, Scottish architect (d. 1921)
- April 7 – Alfred B. Mullett, English-born American architect (d. 1890)

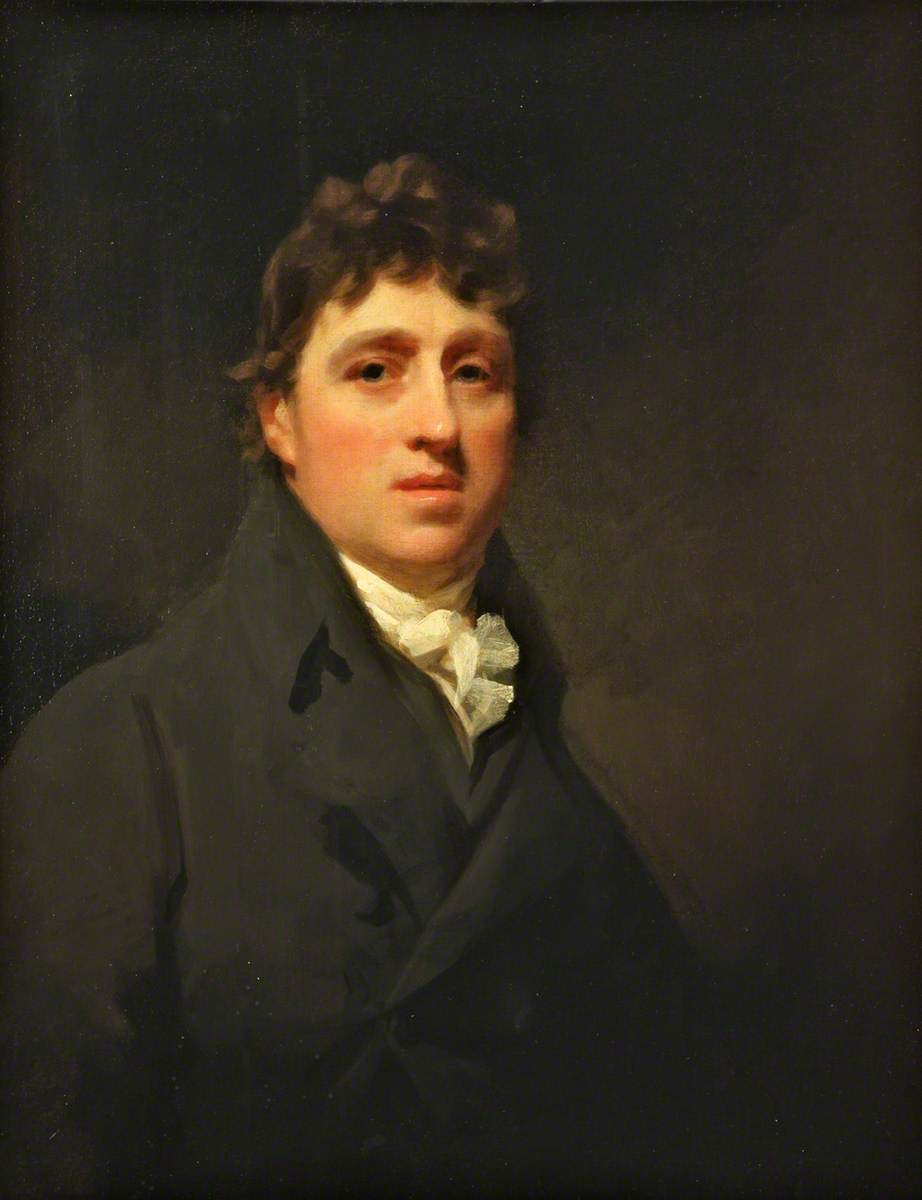
Thomas Telford

- May 23 – Jānis Frīdrihs Baumanis, Latvian architect (d. 1891)
- August 2 – Frédéric Bartholdi, French sculptor (d. 1904)
- Date unknown – Giorgio Costantino Schinas, Maltese architect and civil engineer (d. 1894)

== Deaths ==
- September 2 – Thomas Telford, Scottish-born stonemason, architect and civil engineer (b. 1757)
- September 5 – Thomas Lee, English architect (b. 1794)
