= 1840 in architecture =

The year 1840 in architecture involved some significant architectural events and new buildings.

== Events ==
- 27 April – The foundation stone of the new Palace of Westminster in London is laid as its reconstruction to a design by Charles Barry following a fire in 1834 begins (completed in 1860).
- 30 September – Foundation of Nelson's Column, designed by William Railton, laid in London, Trafalgar Square being laid out and paved around it during the year.

== Buildings and structures ==
=== Buildings opened ===
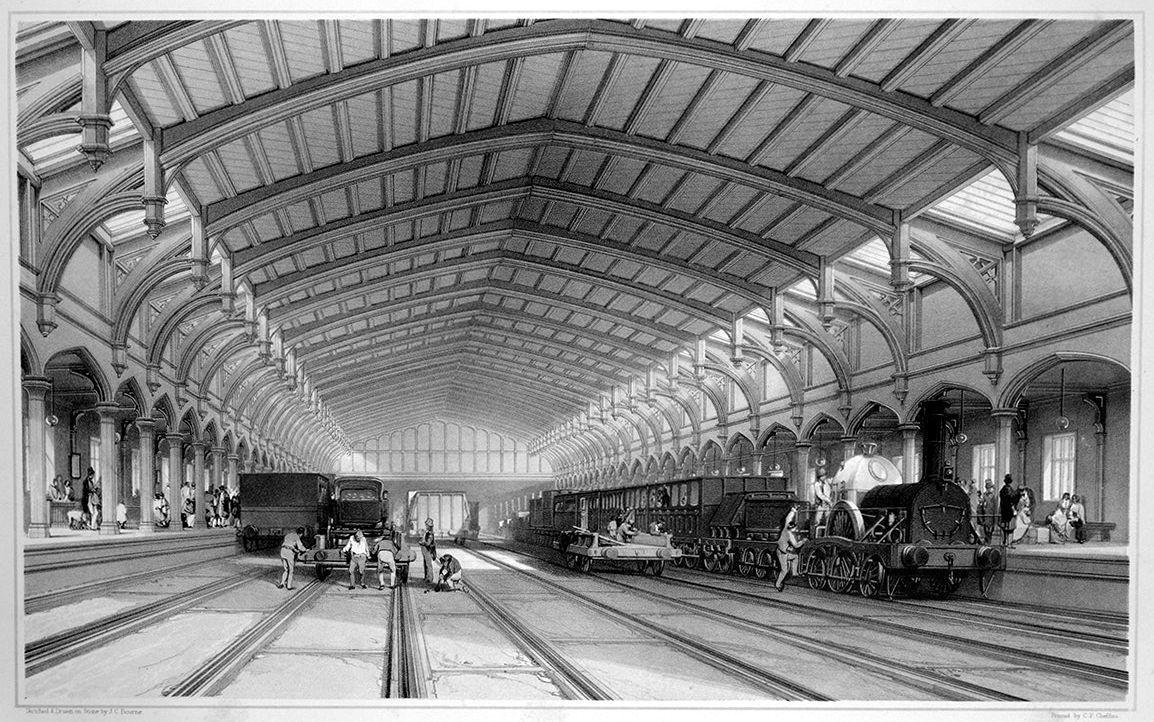
I. K. Brunel's train shed at Bristol Temple Meads; engraving by John Cooke Bourne

- 11 May – Wingfield railway station in England, designed by Francis Thompson, is opened.
- 31 August – Bristol Temple Meads railway station in England, designed by Isambard Kingdom Brunel, is opened.
- July Column, Place de la Bastille, Paris, designed by Jean-Antoine Alavoine and Joseph-Louis Duc, erected, incorporating Auguste Dumont's Génie de la Liberté and bas-reliefs by Antoine-Louis Barye and others.
- Khaplu Palace built.
- Old Patent Office Building, Washington D.C., United States completed by Robert Mills.
- Forglen House, Scotland, designed by John Smith, is completed at about this date.

== Awards ==
- Grand Prix de Rome, architecture: Théodore Ballu.

== Births ==
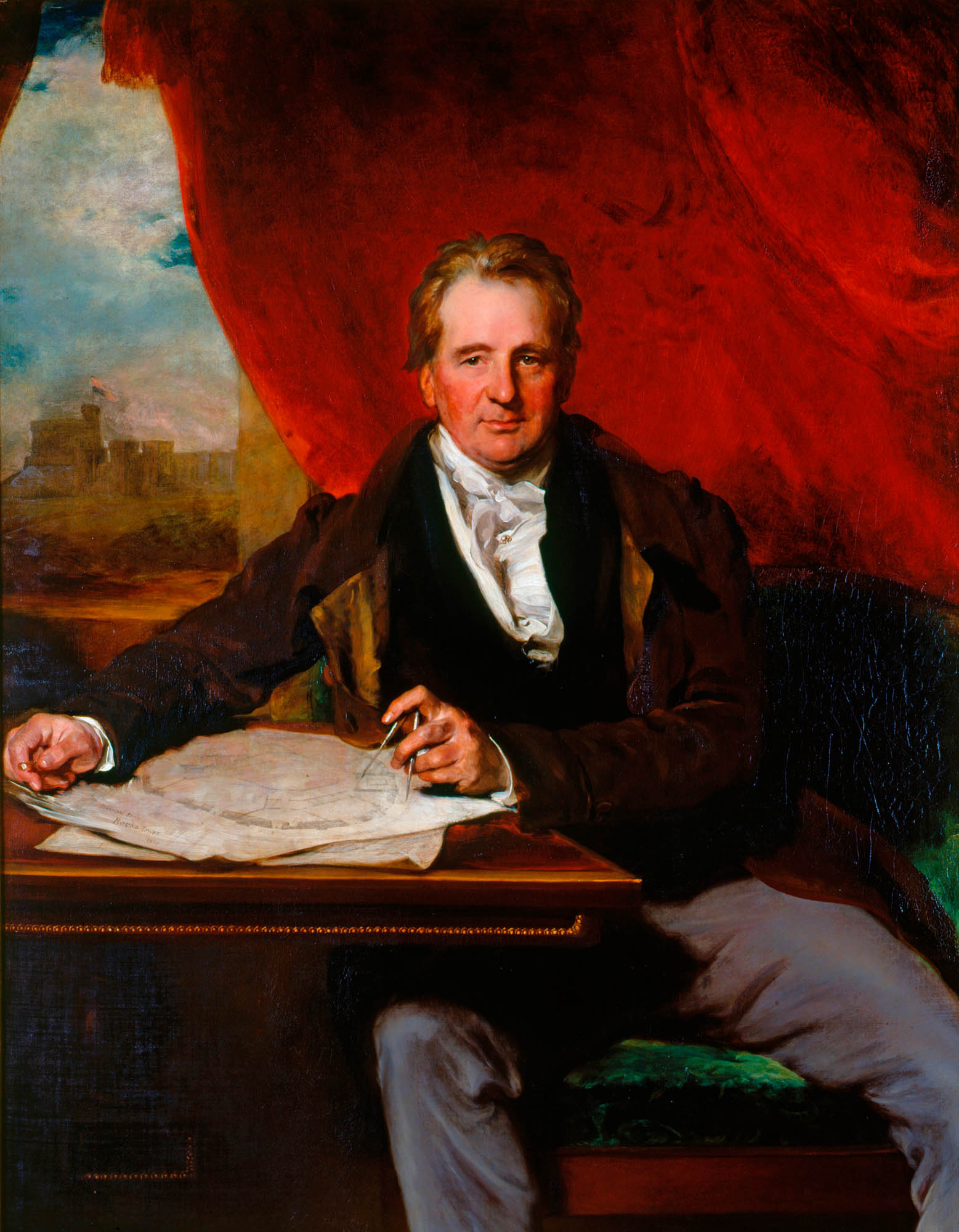
Jeffry Wyatville

- January 11 – Robert Chisholm, English-born architect working in British India; proponent of the Indo-Saracenic style (died 1915)
- J. M. Brydon, Scottish-born architect working in London (died 1901)

== Deaths ==
- February 18 – Sir Jeffry Wyatville, English architect and garden designer (born 1766)
- May 4 – Carl Ludvig Engel, German Empire style architect (born 1778)
