= 1720 in architecture =

The year 1720 in architecture involved some significant events.

== Events ==
- First Prix de Rome in architecture awarded in France to Antoine Derizet.
- Nobile Teatro di San Giacomo di Corfù converted into a theatre.

== Buildings and structures ==
=== Buildings ===
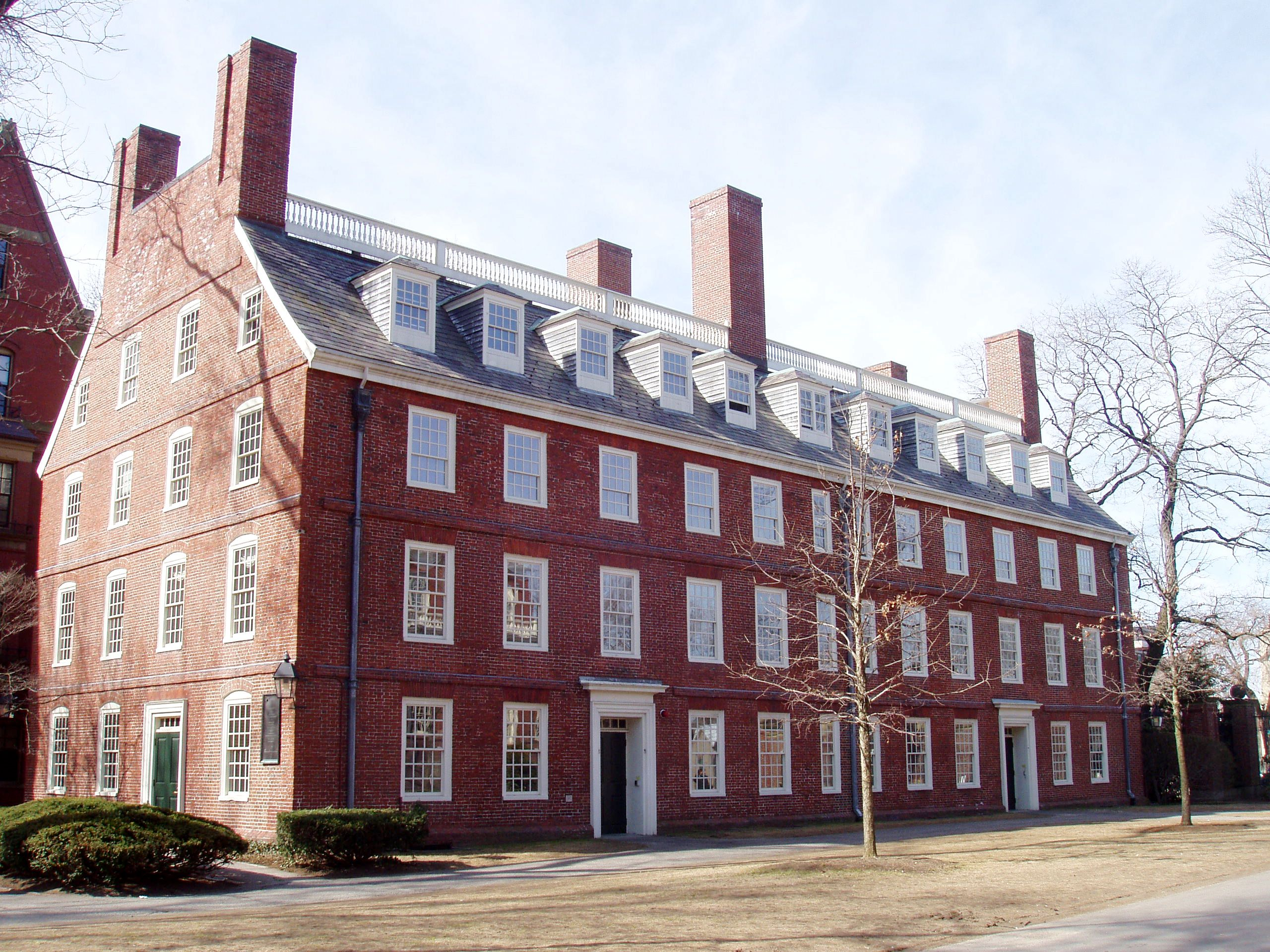
Massachusetts Hall (Harvard University)

- Massachusetts Hall (Harvard University) is completed.
- Rebuilding of All Saints Church, Oxford (in The High) is completed to designs by Henry Aldrich with tower and spire probably by Nicholas Hawksmoor.
- 213 and 215 King's Road, Chelsea, London.
- Baroque remodelling of the Church of the Teutonic Order, Vienna, probably by Anton Erhard Martinelli.
- Church of the Presentation of the Virgin in the Temple in Bârsana, Romania (one of the wooden churches of Maramureș).
- Replacement wooden Holy Trinity Church, Zhovkva, Ukraine.
- Schloss Bruchsal in Baden is commissioned from Anselm von Grünstein.

== Births ==
- March 22 – Nicolas-Henri Jardin, French architect (d. 1799)
- October 4 – Giovanni Battista Piranesi, Italian etcher of architectural views (d. 1778)
- November 30 – André Soares, Portuguese sculptor and architect (d. 1769)
