= Hjo Church =

Coordinates: 58.3019°N 14.2879°E

- Hjo kyrka
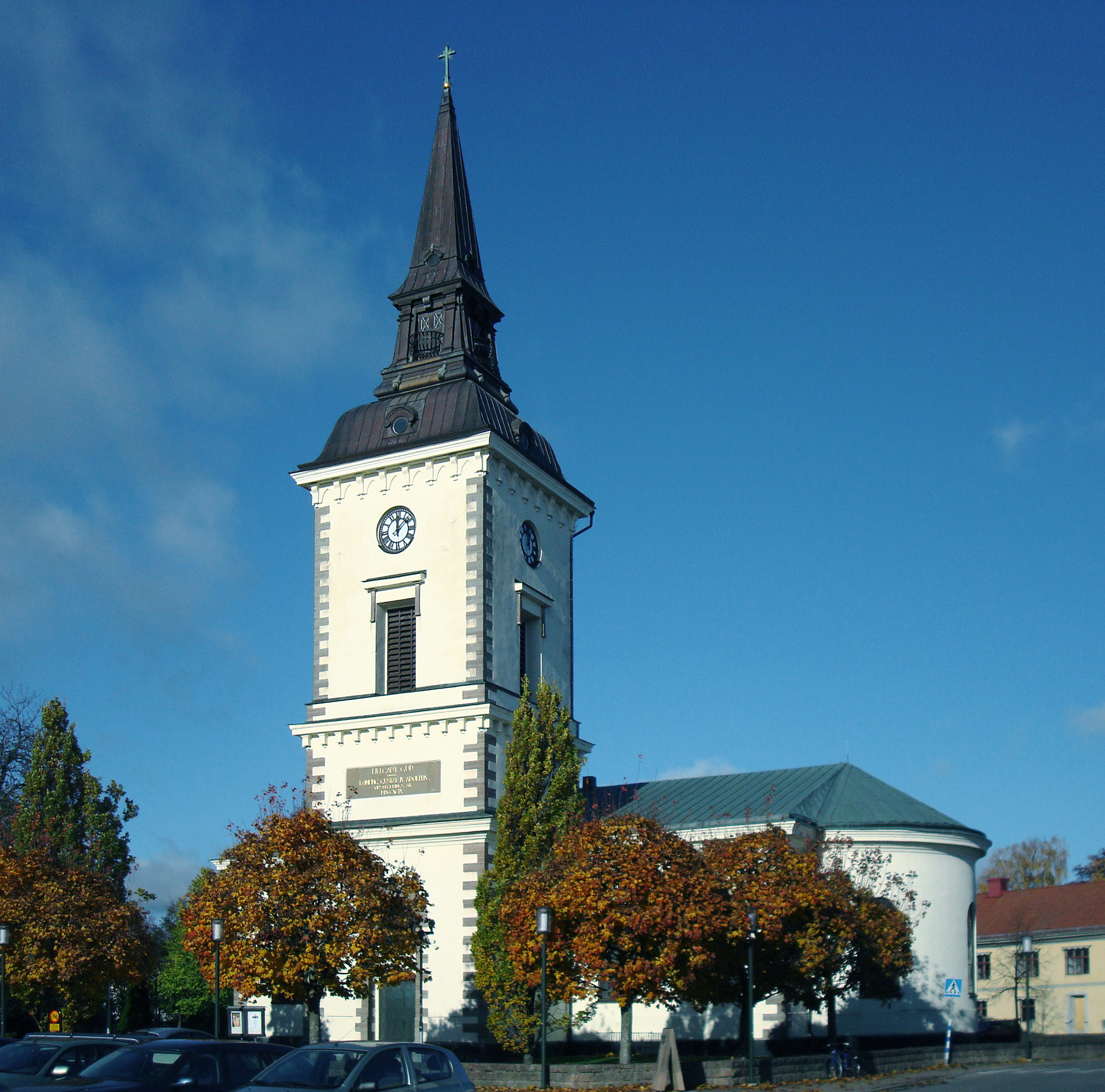
- Hjo Church in October 2009
- Hjo Church
- Location: Hjo
- Country: Sweden
- Denomination: Church of Sweden

Administration
- Diocese: Skara
- Parish: Parish

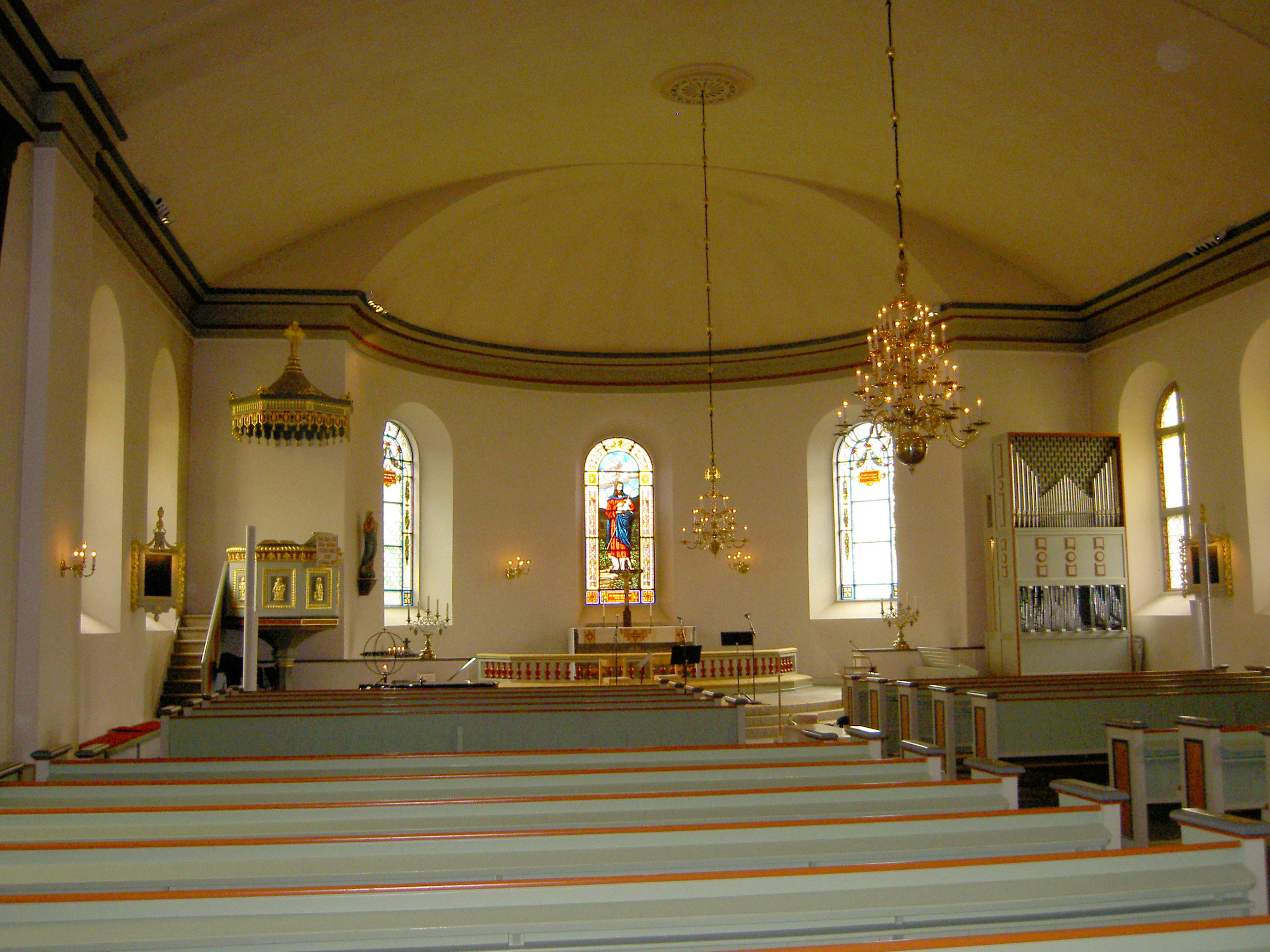
Inside Hjo Church

Hjo Church (Swedish: Hjo kyrka) is a church in Hjo in Sweden. A 1794 fire destroyed the old church. Belonging to Hjo Parish of the Church of Sweden, construction of the current church began in 1796 and was completed in 1799.
