= Batumi Synagogue =

Synagogue in Batumi, Georgia (country)

- Georgian: ბათუმის სინაგოგა
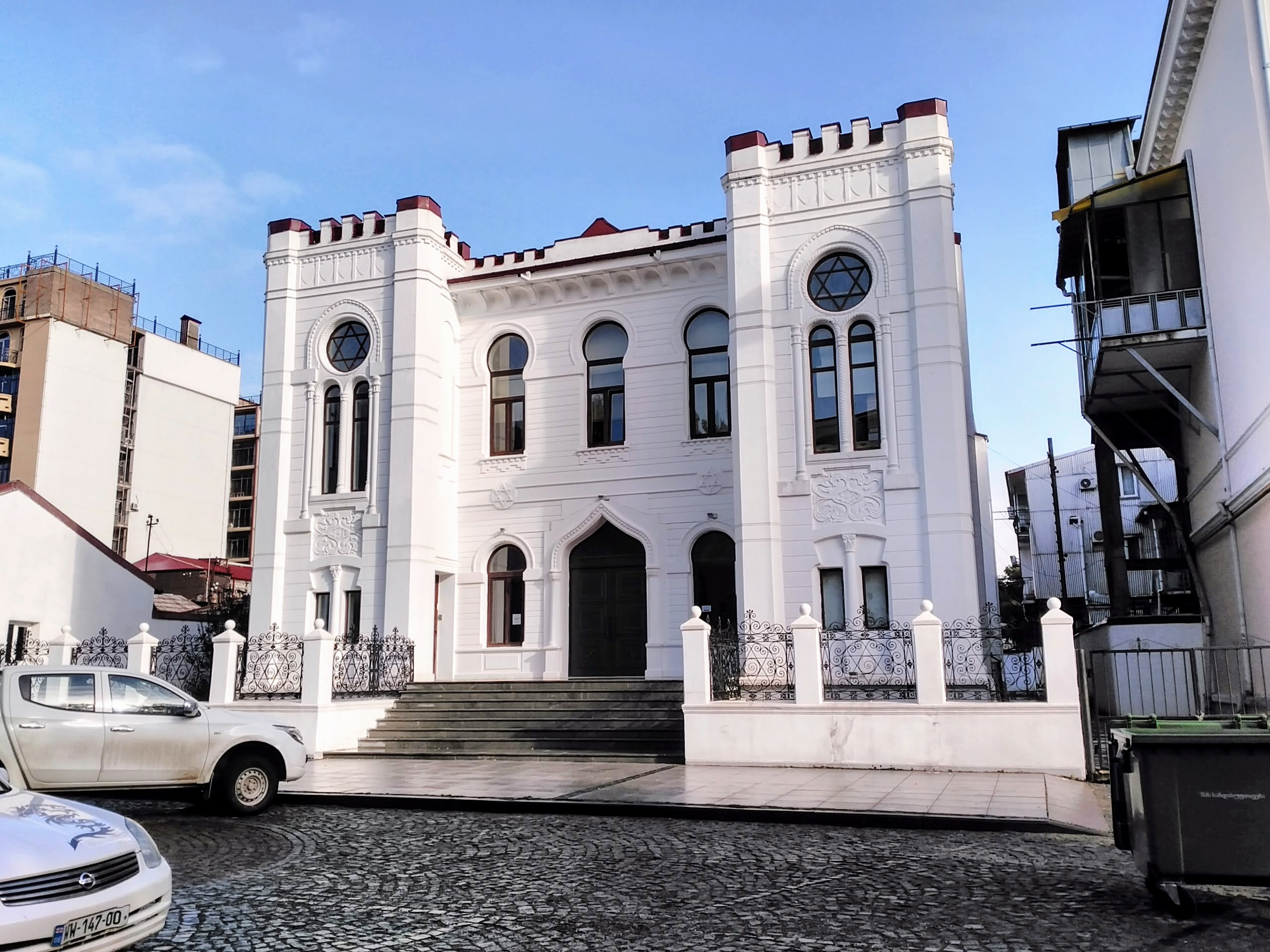
- Batumi Synagogue in 2016

- Location of the synagogue in Georgia

Religion
- Affiliation: Judaism
- Rite: Georgian Jewish
- Ecclesiastical or organizational status: Synagogue
- Status: Active

Location
- Location: 33 Vazha-Pshavela Street, Batumi, Adjara
- Country: Georgia
- Interactive map of Batumi Synagogue
- Coordinates: 41°38′51″N 41°38′04″E

Architecture
- Completed: 1904

Batumi Synagogue (Georgian: ბათუმის სინაგოგა, batumis sinagoga), also known as the Stone Ashkenazi Synagogue, is a synagogue located in Batumi, Adjara, Georgia. The building was constructed in 1904 under the direction of Semyon Vulkovich, a prominent local Jewish leader. The building was used by Ashkenazi Jews in Batumi until 1923, when it became a Soviet sports hall.

== Architecture ==
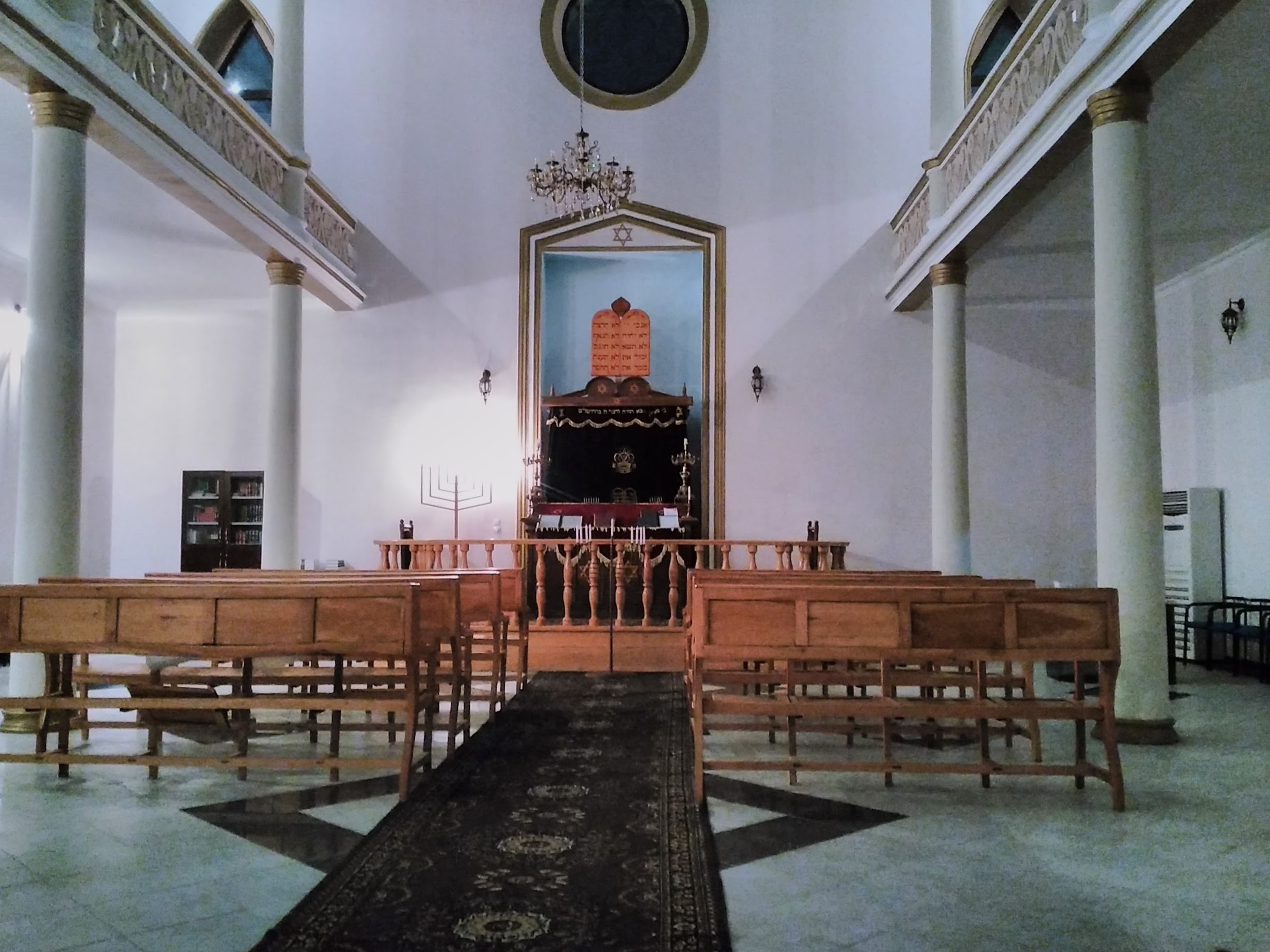
The interior of Batumi Synagogue in 2016

The synagogue has historically served as the religious and cultural center of Batumi’s Jewish community. Its architecture reflects early 20th-century European influences, combined with local stylistic elements. Inspirations were drawn from the synagogues of Amsterdam and The Hague.

== History ==
European Jews illegally established a house of prayer in Batumi in the late 19th century. The government postponed their request to establish a synagogue three times, leading the Jews to turn to the rabbi of Kutaisi for help. Only in 1899, did they get official approval to begin building from the Emperor Nicholas II of Russia.

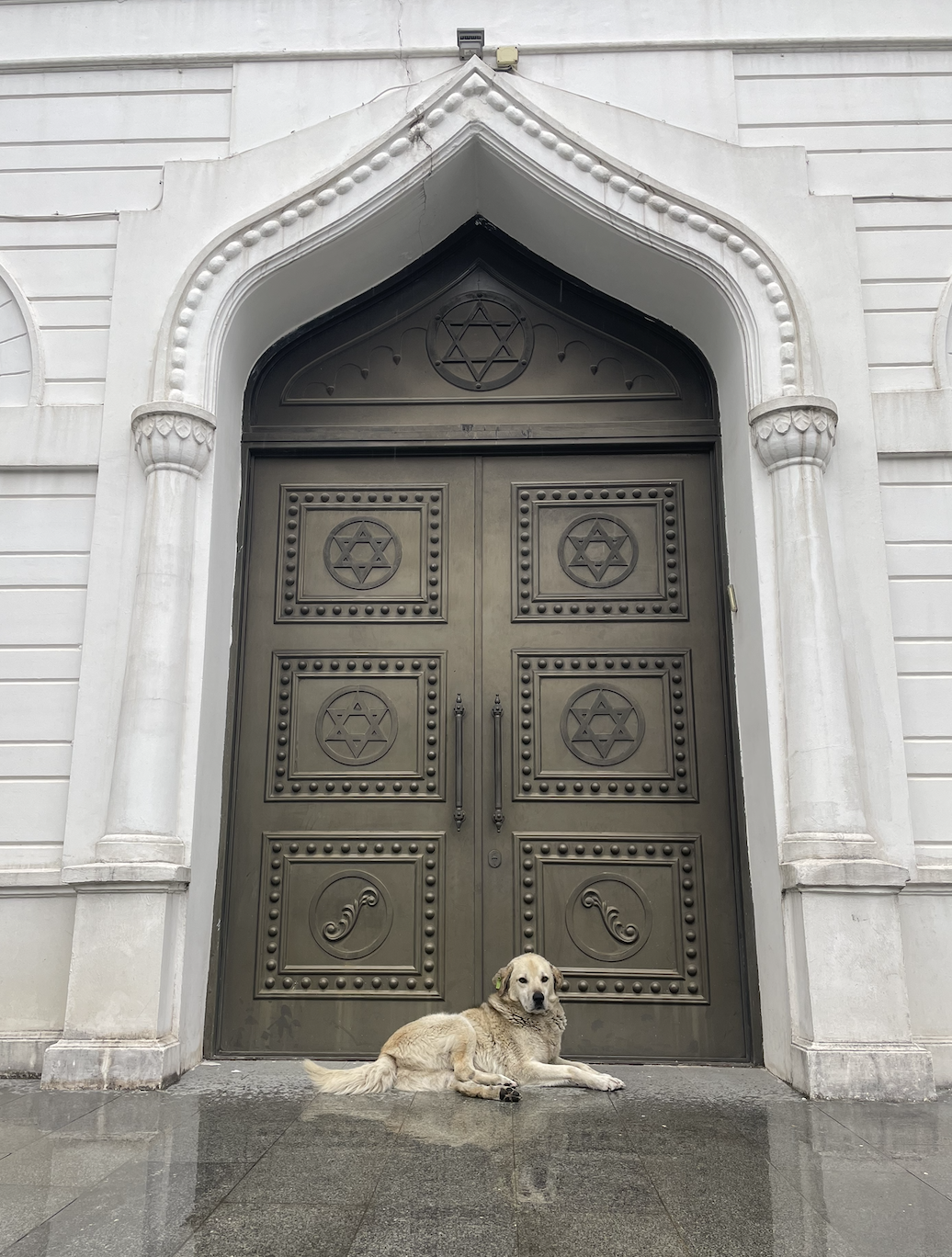
A street dog sleeping in front of the doors of the Batumi Synagogue

The Jews bought the building from a Turkish citizen for 2,000 manats. The building was first opened in 1904, but remained unfinished until at least 1912. Architect Semion Lev Vulkovich designed and led the project.

During the Soviet era, the building was used for a variety of purposes, including as a sports club. When the synagogue was closed, Jews conducted their religious observations in their own apartments.

Despite these periods of closure during the Soviet era, the synagogue was preserved and later restored. In November 1998, Batumi Synagogue resumed its role as a place of worship and community gathering.

Today, Batumi Synagogue remains active, offering religious services and functioning as a symbol of the enduring Jewish heritage in Georgia’s Black Sea region.

== Gallery ==
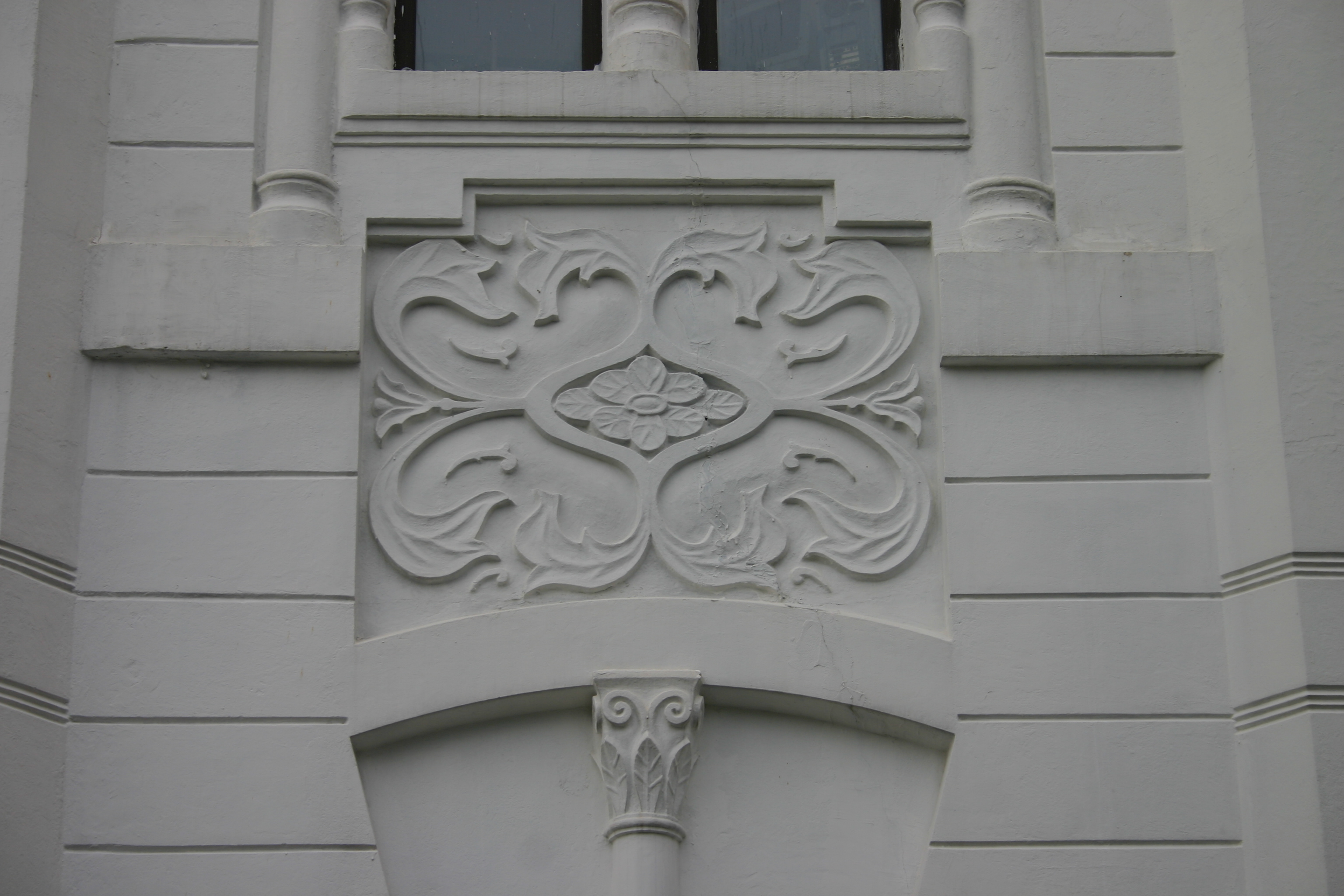
Detail of stone work

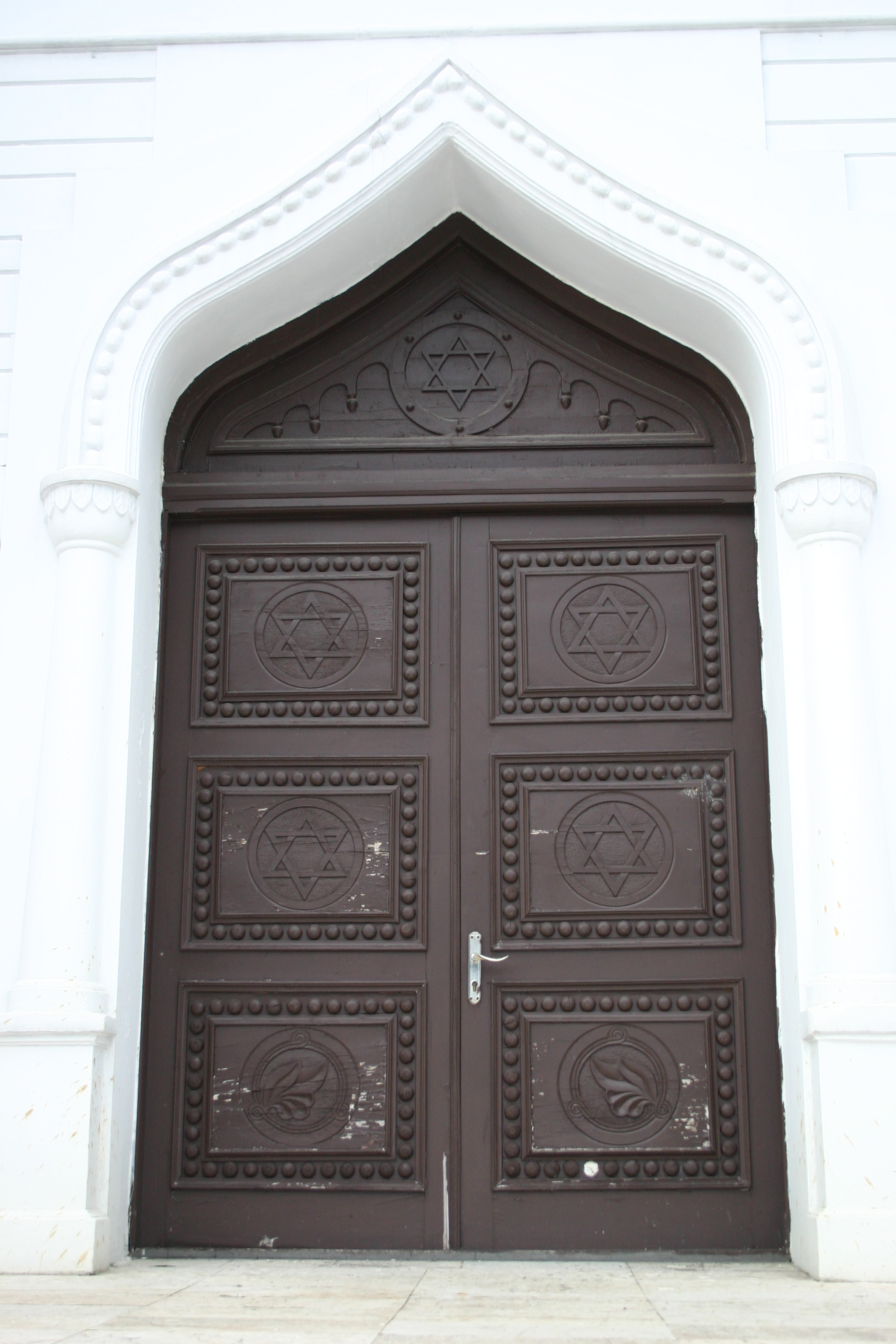
Front door

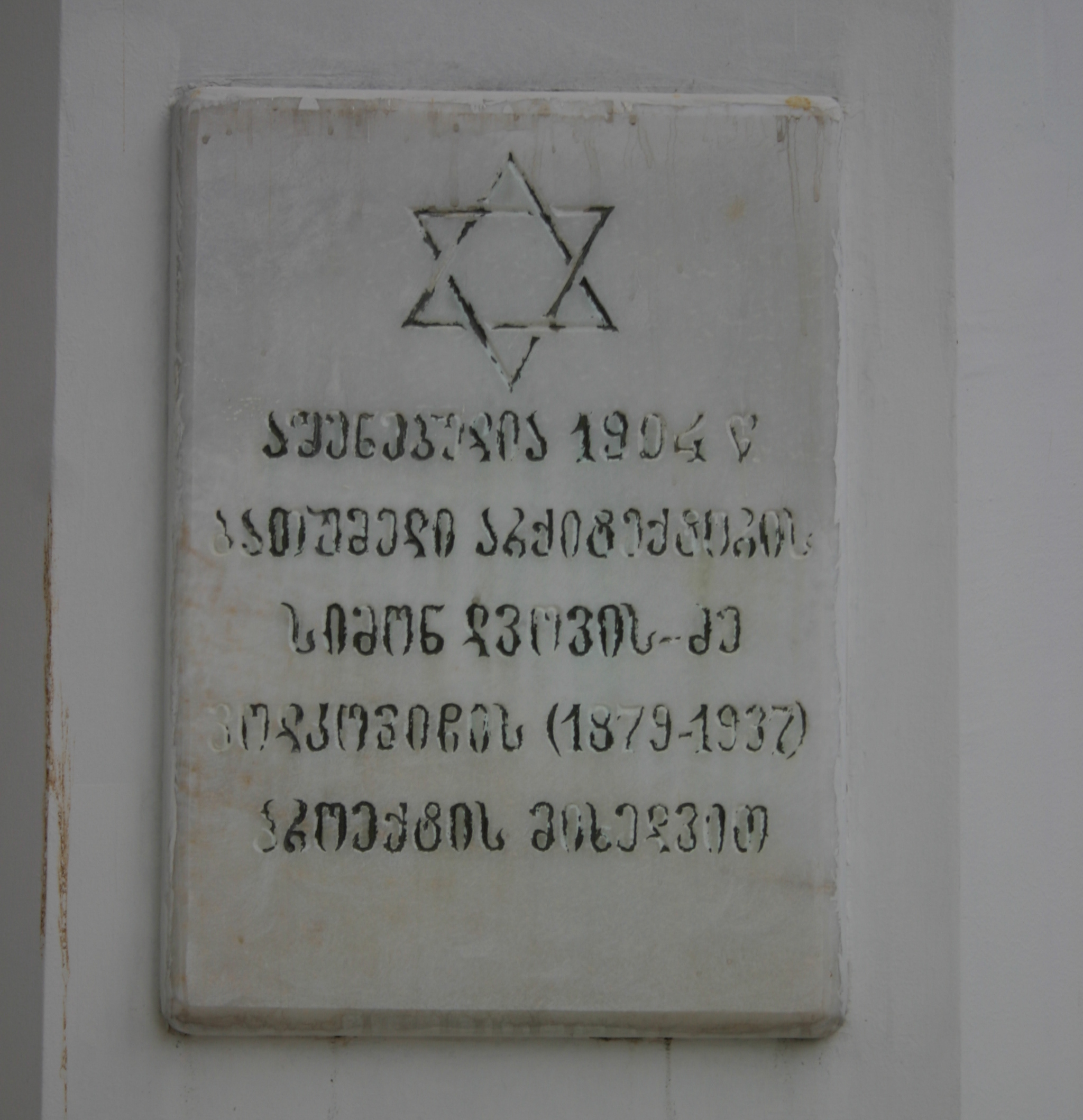
Plaque reading: Built in 1904 according to the project of Batumi architect Simon Lvov-dze Volkovich (1879-1937)

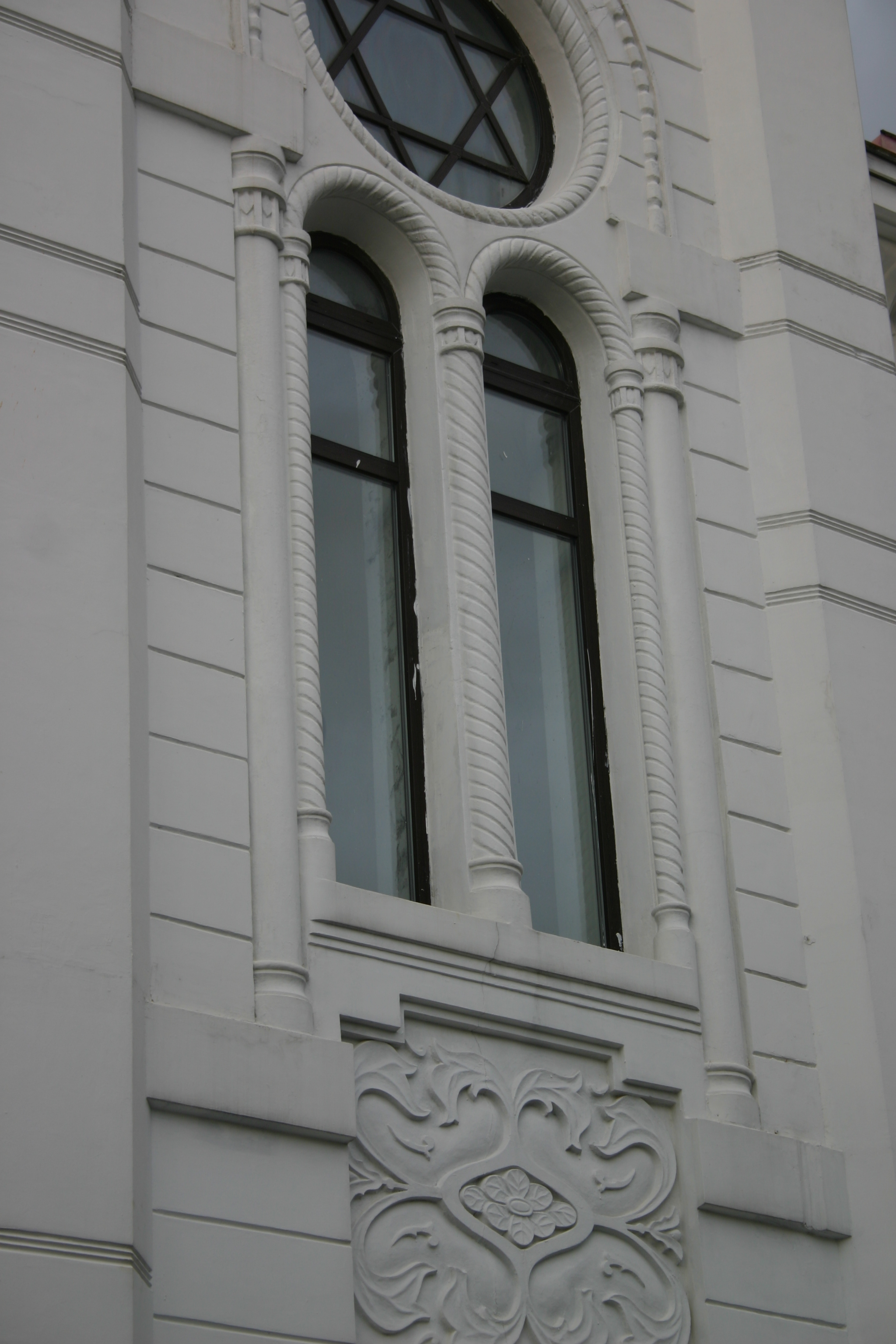
Windows

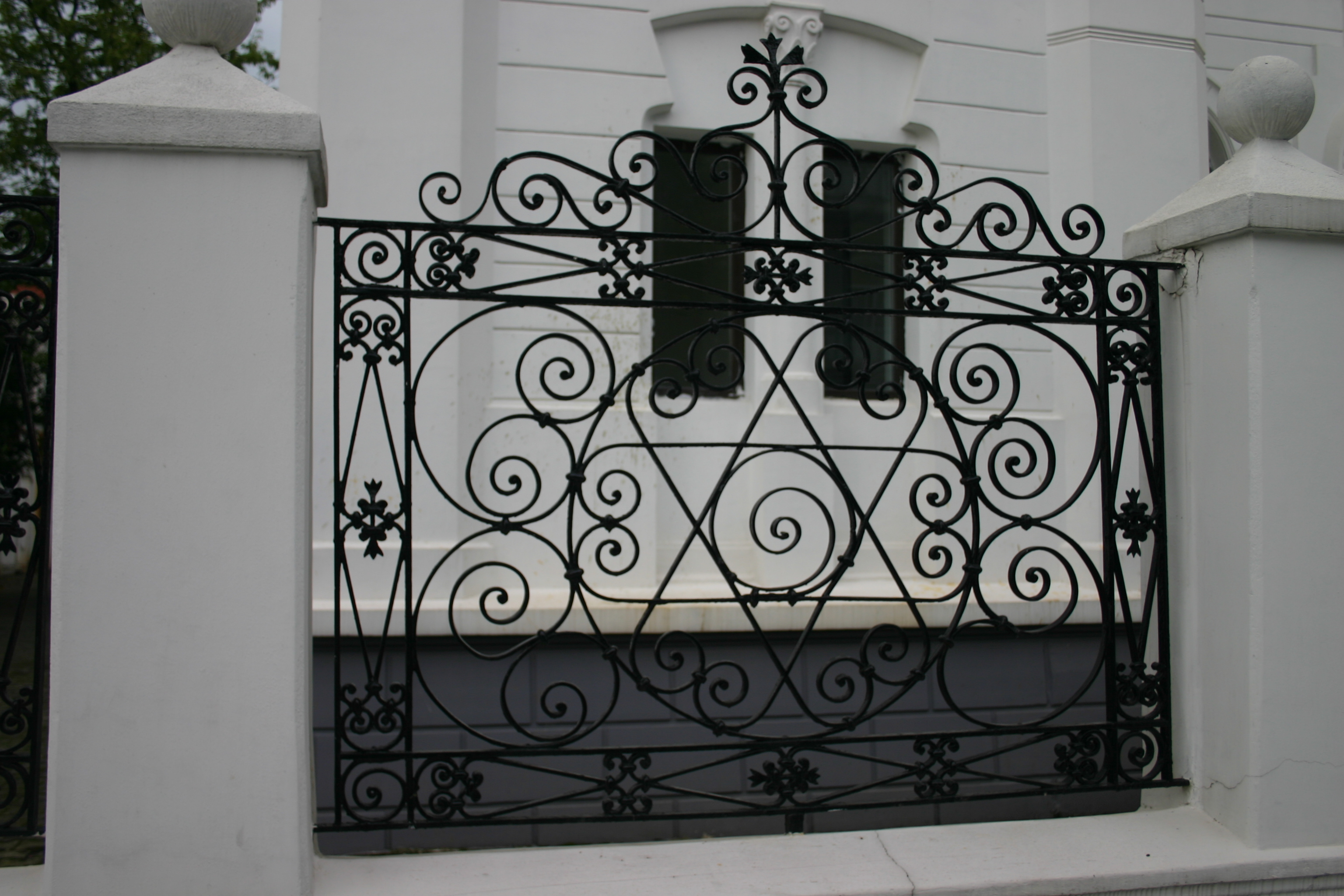
Gate design

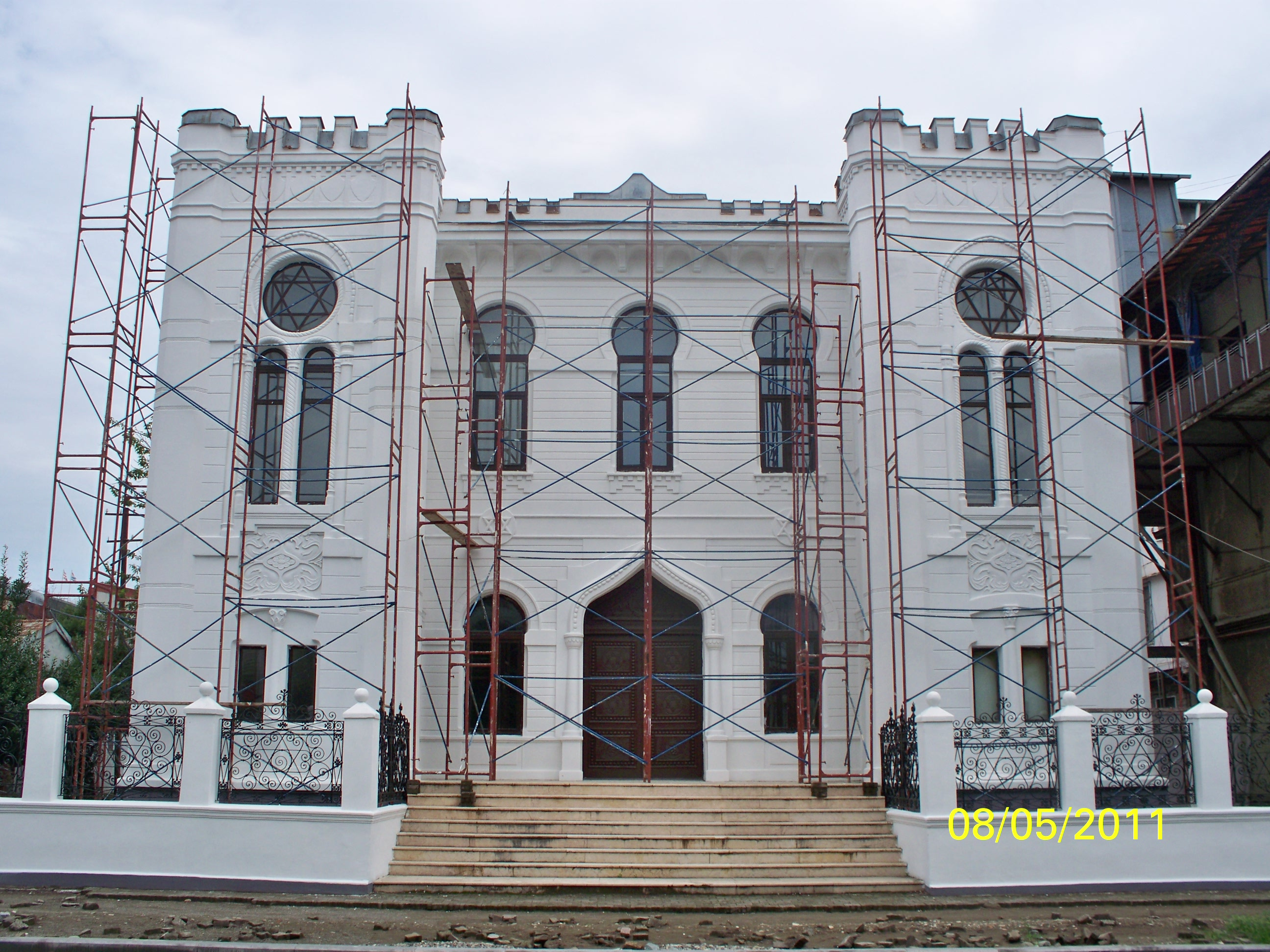
Construction on Batumi Synagogue

== See also ==
- History of the Jews in Georgia
