= De Zwaluw, Hoogeveen =

Dutch windmill

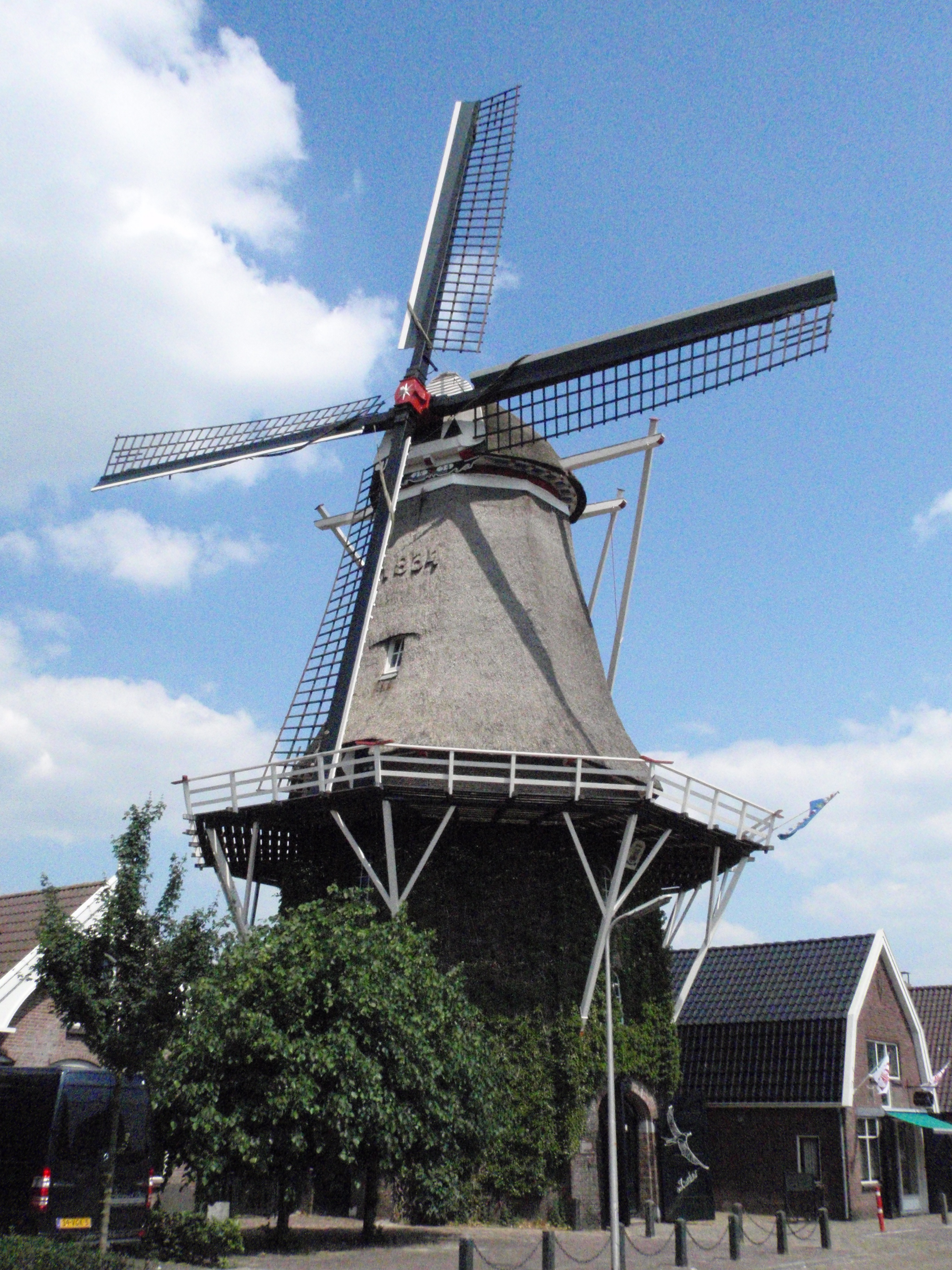

Origin
- Mill name: De Zwaluw
- Mill location: Hoogeveen, Drenthe, Netherlands
- Coordinates: 52°43′31″N 6°28′56″E
- Operator(s): Gemeente Hoogeveen
- Year built: 1834

Information
- Purpose: Corn mill
- Type: Smock mill
- Storeys: Three-storey smock
- Base storeys: Four-storey base
- Smock sides: Eight sides
- No. of sails: Four sails
- Type of sails: Common sails
- Windshaft: Cast iron
- Winding: Tailpole and winch
- Auxiliary power: Electric motor
- No. of pairs of millstones: Three pairs
- Size of millstones: French Burrs 1.40 metres (4 ft 7 in) diameter, Cullens 1.50 metres (4 ft 11 in) diameter

De Zwaluw (English: The Swallow) is a smock mill in Hoogeveen, Drenthe, the Netherlands which is working commercially. It is the third mill to stand on this site as two previous mills both burnt down. It was built in 1834 and is listed as a Rijksmonument, No. 22254.

== History ==
The first mill on this site was standing c1714. In 1787 it was burnt down. A new mill was built by Roelof Steenbergen. In 1807, the mill passed to Meeuwes Steenbergen and then to Lucas Quirinus Robaard in 1826. In 1833, the mill was burnt down, leaving the brick base standing. A new mill was built on the old base in 1834 for Lucas Quirinus Robaard and Karsjen Meeuwes Steenbergen. In 1836, ownership of the mill passed to Meeuwes Robaard. It remained in his ownership until his death in 1906, passing to Koop Robaard. In 1927, Koop Robaard died and his family sold the mill to C. Thomas. The mill was passed to Jacob Thomas in 1938.

A restoration was carried out on the mill in 1947. On 2 September 1956 there was a fire at the mill. Repair work was started in 1960 and completed in September 1961. The condition of the mill deteriorated until it again required repairs. In 1975, the mill was sold to the local authority, Gemeente Hoogeveen. On 28 April 1978 the Gemeente Hoogeveen decided to restore the mill. The restoration was done by millwright J B Medendorp of Zuidlaren. The mill was named De Zwaluw in 1983 and a further restoration was undertaken in 1999.

== Description ==
De Zwaluw is what the Dutch describe as an "achtkante stellingmolen". It is a smock mill with a brick base and a stage. The stage is located at third-storey level, 9.10 metres (29 ft 10 in) above ground level. The smock and cap are thatched. The four Common sails, which have a span of 24.60 metres (80 ft 9 in) are carried in a cast-iron windshaft. This was cast by Fabrikaat Prins van Oranje, The Hague in 1867. The windshaft also carries the brake wheel which has 63 cogs. The brake wheel drives the wallower (30 cogs) at the top of the upright shaft. At the bottom of the upright shaft, the great spur wheel, which has 105 cogs drives two pairs of millstones via lantern pinion stone nuts each having 34 staves. One pair of millstones are French Burr stones of 1.40 metres (4 ft 7 in) diameter and the other pair are Cullen stones of 1.50 metres (4 ft 11 in) diameter. A third pair of millstones are no longer in use. A fourth pair is driven by an electric motor.

== Millers ==
1st mill

- Roelof Steenbergen 1716-87

2nd mill

- Roelof Steenbergen 1787-1807
- Meeuwes Steenbergen 1807-26
- Lucas Quirinus Robaard 1826-33

De Zwaluw

- Lucas Quirinus Robaard 1834-35
- Meeuwes Robaard 1835-1906
- Koop Robaard 1906-27
- C. Thomas 1927-38
- Jacob Thomas 1938-75, 1980–91
- Bert van Uffelen 1980-2003
- H. Valkenhoff 1983 - date
- J. N. J. Vondeling 2003 - date.
- A. Mulder 2006 - date

Reference for above:-

== Public access ==
De Zwaluw is open to the public on Thursday from 09:30 to 12:30 and on Saturdays from 09:30 to 12:30, or when the mill is working.
