= 1728 in architecture =

The year 1728 in architecture involved some significant events.

== Events ==
- October 20–23 – Copenhagen Fire of 1728.

== Buildings and structures ==
=== Buildings ===
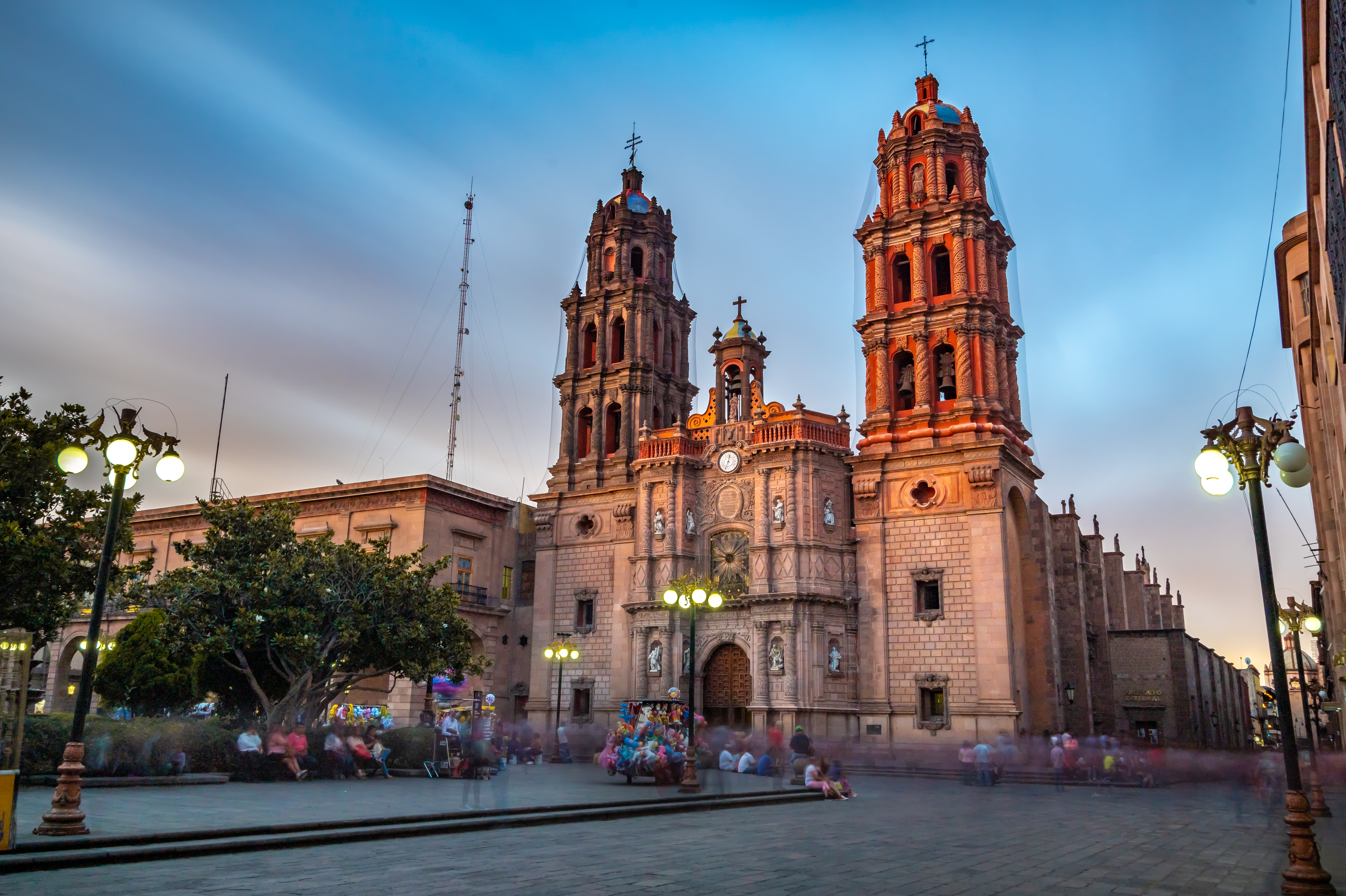
Catedral de San Luis Potosí

- Catedral de Nuestra Señora de la Expectación in San Luis Potosí, Mexico, is completed.
- Seaton Delaval Hall in Northumberland, designed by Sir John Vanbrugh (died 1726), is completed.
- White Lodge, Richmond Park, near London, designed by Roger Morris, is completed as Stone Lodge.
- St John's, Smith Square in London, designed by Thomas Archer, is completed for the Commission for Building Fifty New Churches.

== Publications ==
- James Gibbs' A Book of Architecture, containing designs of buildings and ornaments is published in London, including a version of the Gibbs surround.

== Awards ==
- Grand Prix de Rome, architecture: Antoine-Victor Desmarais.

== Births ==
- February 12 – Étienne-Louis Boullée (died 1799)
- February 25 – John Wood, the Younger (died 1782)
- July 3 – Robert Adam (died 1792)
- Richard Jupp (died 1799)

== Deaths ==
- April 10 – Nicodemus Tessin the Younger (born 1654)
- date unknown – Giovanni Barbara, Maltese architect and military engineer (born 1642)
