= 1745 in architecture =

This is a list of events related to architecture in 1745.

== Events ==
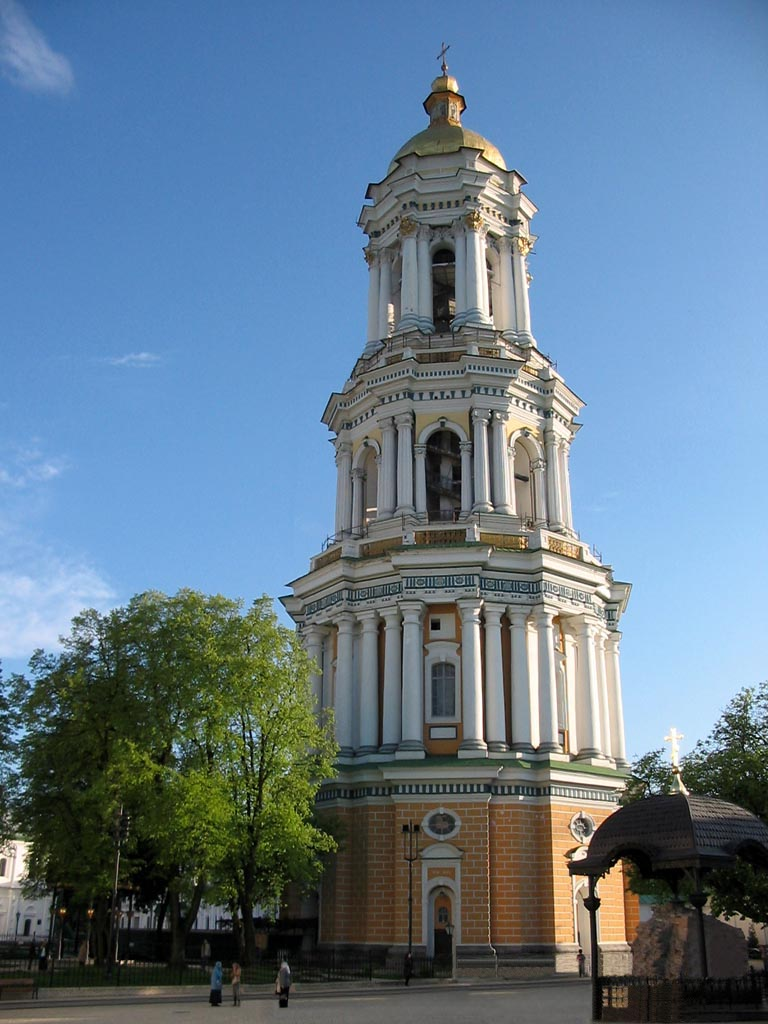
Great Lavra Belltower, Kiev

== Buildings and structures ==
=== Buildings ===
- The Great Lavra Bell Tower, the main bell tower of the ancient cave monastery of Kiev Pechersk Lavra in Kiev (modern-day capital of Ukraine), designed by Johann Gottfried Schädel, is completed (begun 1731).
- Construction of the Wieskirche in Bavaria, designed by Dominikus Zimmermann, is begun (structure completed 1754)

== Births ==
- May 5 – Carl August Ehrensvärd, Swedish naval officer, painter, author and neoclassical architect (died 1800)
- July 20 – Henry Holland, English architect (died 1806)
- Pierre-Adrien Pâris, French architect, painter and designer (died 1819)

== Deaths ==
- February 23 – Joseph Effner, German architect and decorator (born 1687)
- June 13 – Domenico Antonio Vaccaro, Neapolitan painter, sculptor and architect (died 1678)
- October 15 – Maximilian von Welsch, German baroque architect (born 1671)
- November 16 – Johann Lukas von Hildebrandt, Genoese-born, Italian-trained Austrian baroque architect (born 1668)
