= Town Hall, Vilnius =

Vilnius Town Hall
- Vilniaus Rotušė
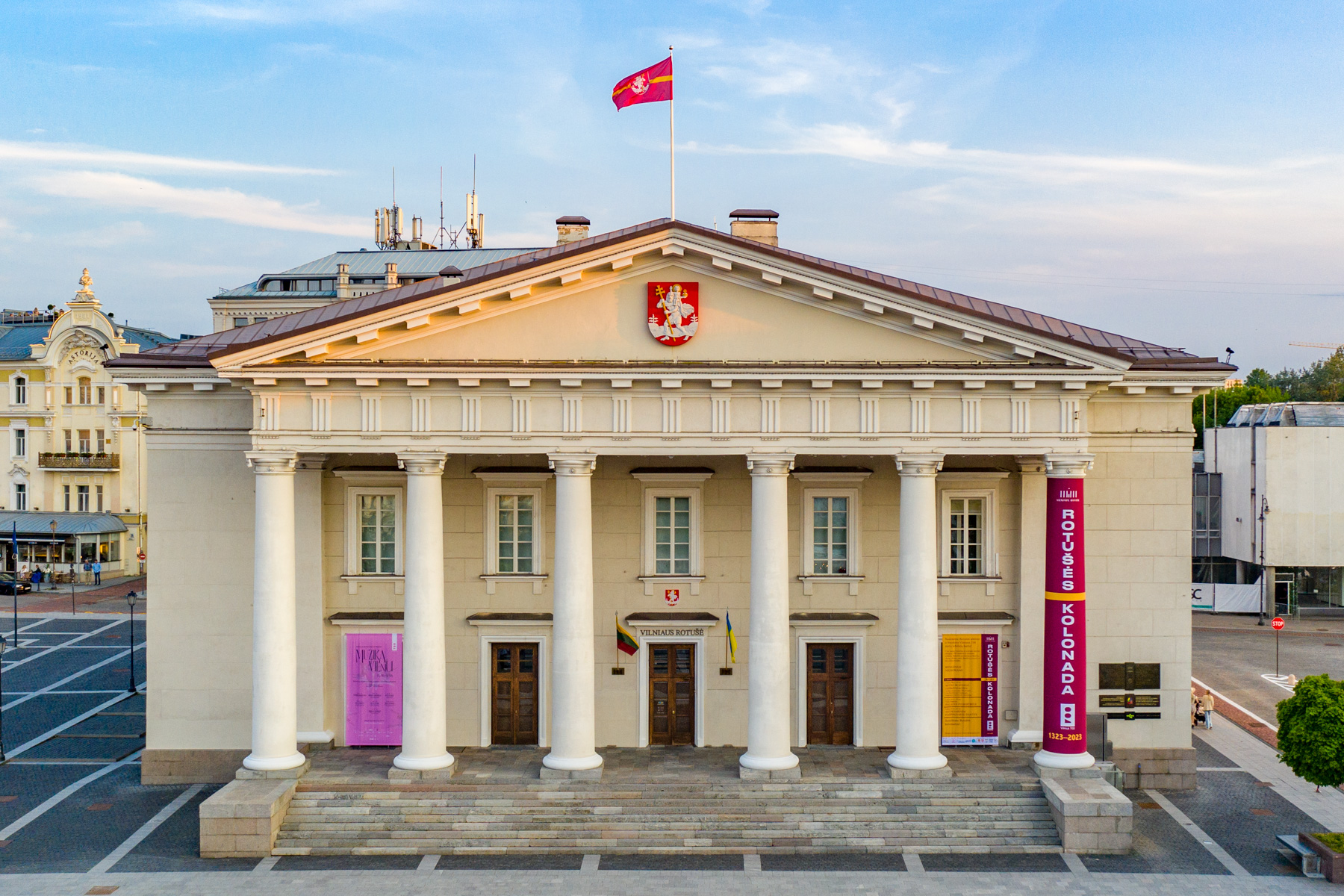
- Main façade seen from Rotušės Square

General information
- Architectural style: Classical Revival
- Location: Didžioji g. 31, 01128 Vilnius, Lithuania
- Coordinates: 54.678°N 25.287°E
- Construction started: 1785
- Completed: 1799

Design and construction
- Architect: Laurynas Gucevičius

Website
- vilniausrotuse.lt

Vilnius Town Hall (Lithuanian: Vilniaus rotušė) is a historical town hall in the square of the same name in the Old Town of Vilnius, Lithuania.

== Palace ==
The town hall in Vilnius was mentioned for the first time in 1432. Initially it was a Gothic style building, and has since been reconstructed many times. The current Vilnius Town Hall was rebuilt in neoclassical style according to the design by Laurynas Gucevičius in 1799. It has remained unchanged since then. Its Gothic cellars have been preserved and may be visited.

Nowadays it is used for representational purposes as well as during the visits of foreign state officials and rulers, including George W. Bush and Queen Elizabeth II.

== Square ==
The Rotušės Square (Lithuanian: Rotušės aikštė) at the end of the Pilies Street is a traditional centre of trade and events in Vilnius. Major annual fairs, such as Kaziukas Fair, are held in this square, the main Christmas tree is decorated here, various concerts and other attractions are organised as well as celebrations of the important dates of the state.

=== History ===
The Old Town Hall in 1763

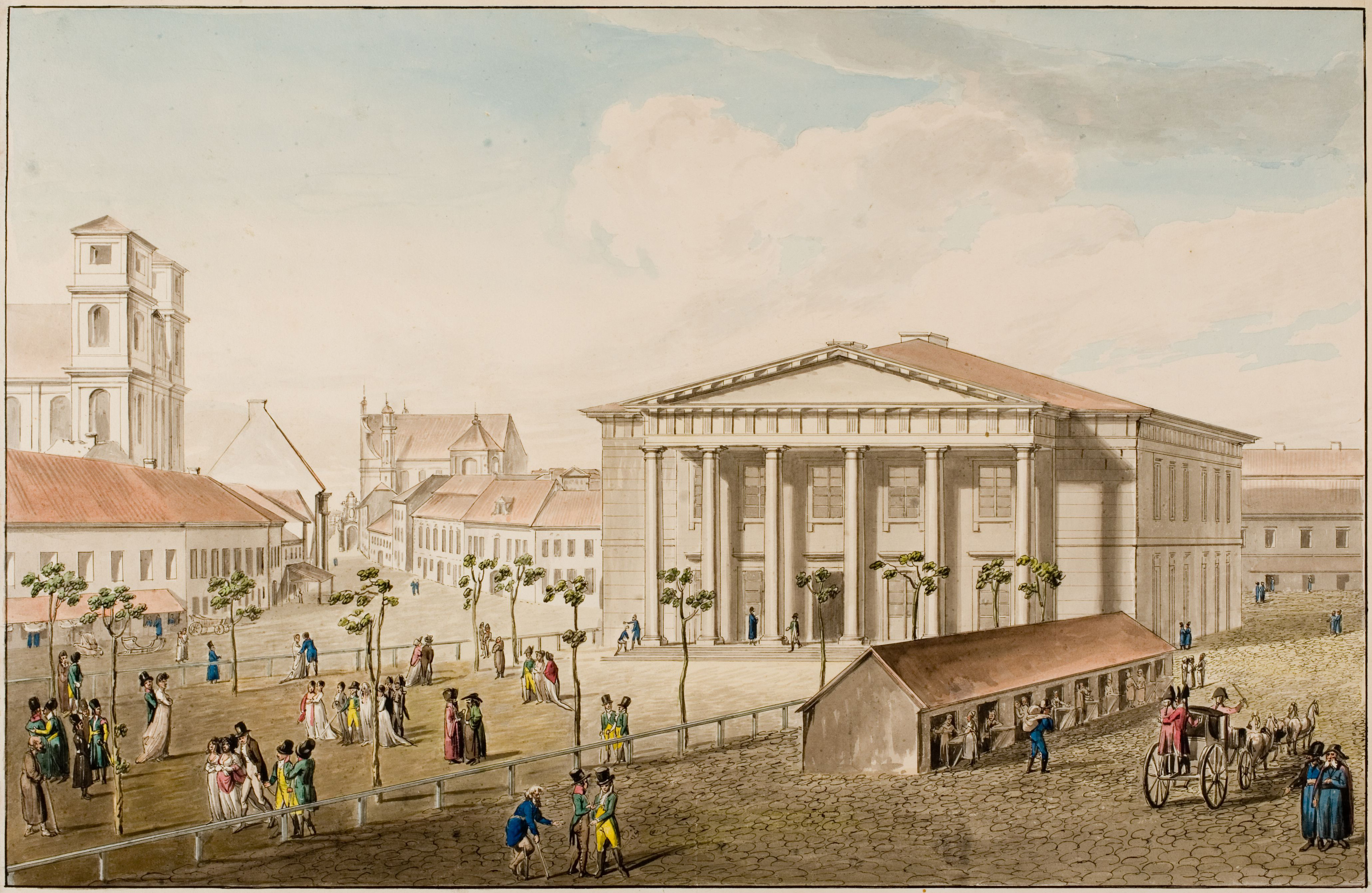
The Town Hall Square with the Neoclassical style Town Hall in 1797

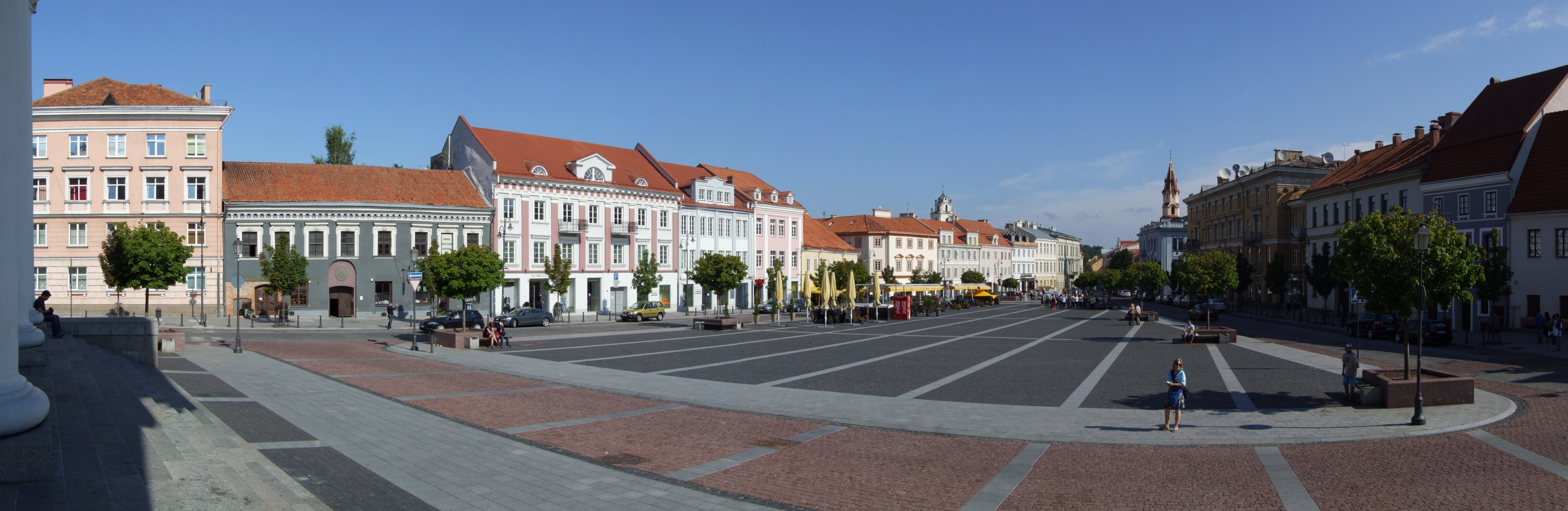
The square after reconstruction, 2011

As far back as the early fifteenth century, the square was bordered by small shops. With the expansion of the city and the development of trade the number of small shops was increasing. Most of them were selling salt, iron and meat products. It is known that all of these shops could not have been sold, donated or transferred freely as everything was strictly regulated. Trading on the Town Hall Square was restricted by regulations such as the prohibition for the Jewish butchers to build their butcher's shops both on the urban market and on Vokiečių (German) Street. It was also prohibited to buy up products on the roadsides and sell them later in the city at a higher price. It was a measure to avoid the season of high prices, especially if there was a shortage of some product such as grain in deficit times. Any violations were punished with monetary fines, flogging, imprisonment and confiscation of merchandise. Confiscated goods were donated to various refuges and hospitals.

Following the example of many established cities Vilnius was granted Magdeburg rights in 1387. Those rights granted a right for merchants on the routes through Vilnius to stop in the capital and to sell their goods in a market. In 1503, due to the number of foreign traders the city built a special guest house for them to stay, on the site of the present day National Philharmonic. They had rooms for merchants and their retinues and premises to store their goods as well as room for horses, carts and sledges. Strict regulations were also imposed on traders and guilds regarding the construction of their market places and participation in the city's events.

However, fighting with resellers was often a real challenge: powerful owners of jurisdictions would not always obey the orders of the rulers. Scottish and Jewish tradesmen in the seventeenth century were forbidden to trade in golden, silver, silk and semi-silk fringes and edgings, but this prohibition was not applied to the said articles produced in manufactures of Naples and Frankfurt.

Many attractions and events were organised in the square such as the performances of bears, travelling acrobats, comedians, and various troupes. The mysteries, or semi-religious performances, were also popular.

The Town Hall Square was the place where various celebrations were announced such as meetings with important guests and foreign rulers and family festivals of local noblemen.

== Gallery ==
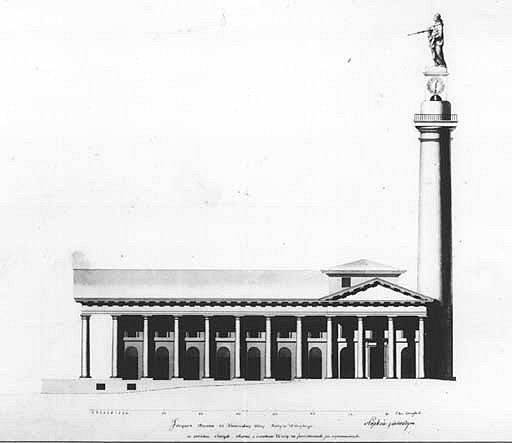
The first reconstruction project by Laurynas Gucevičius

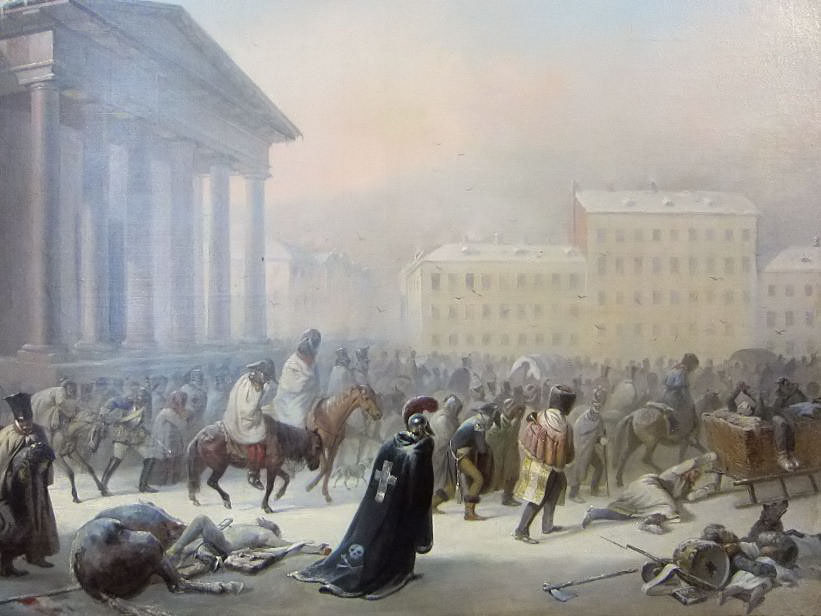
Retreating French army after unsuccessful invasion of Russia in 1812

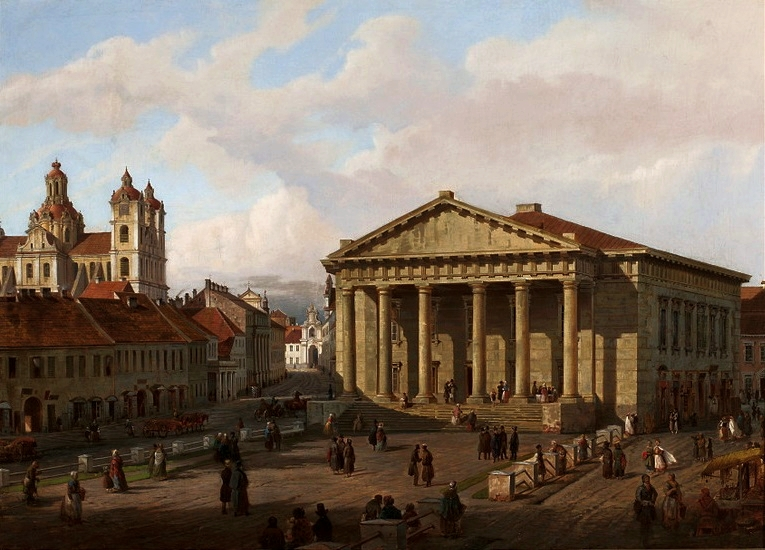
Marcin Zaleski, Vilnius Town Hall, 1863

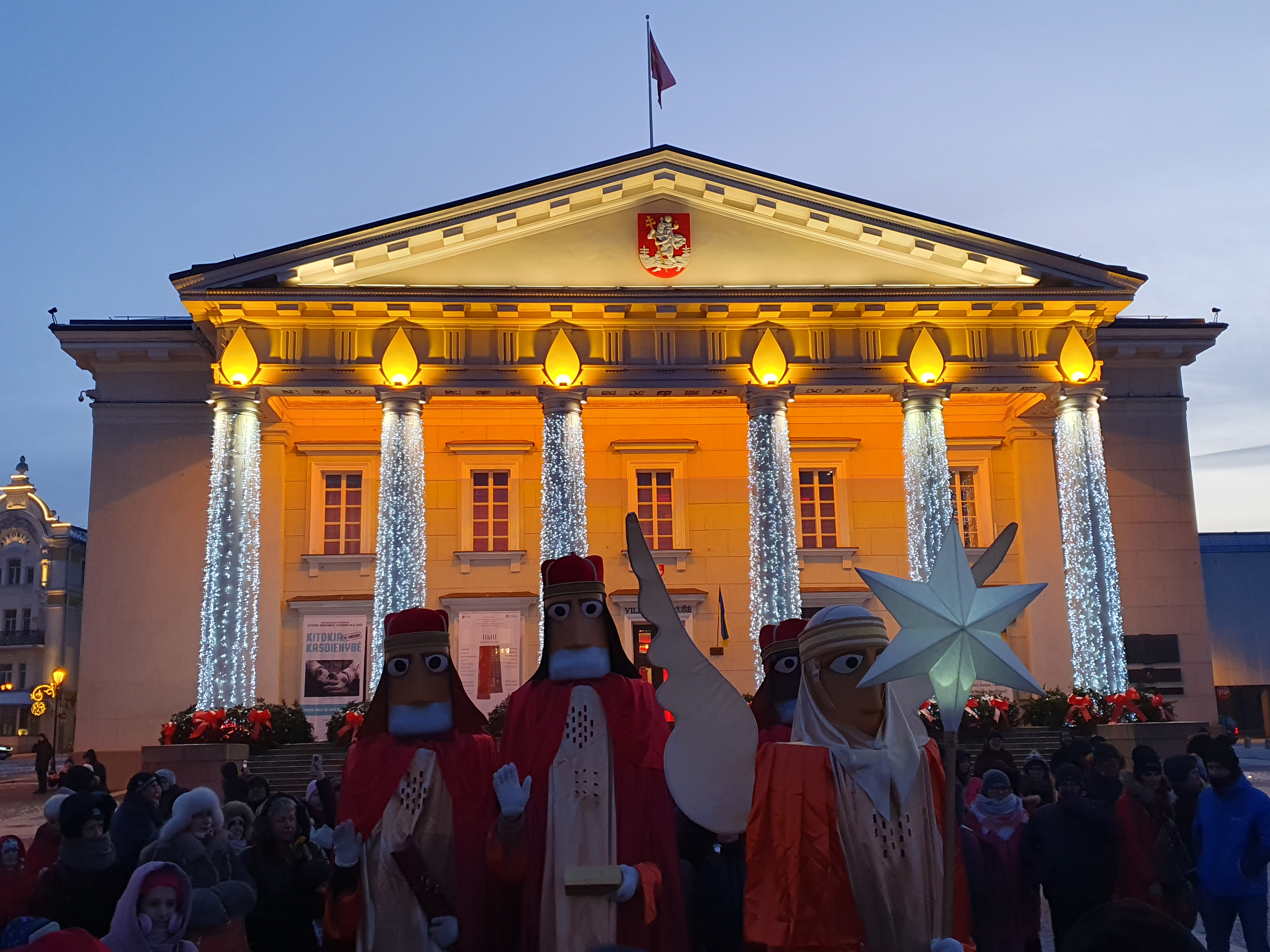
Winter 2023

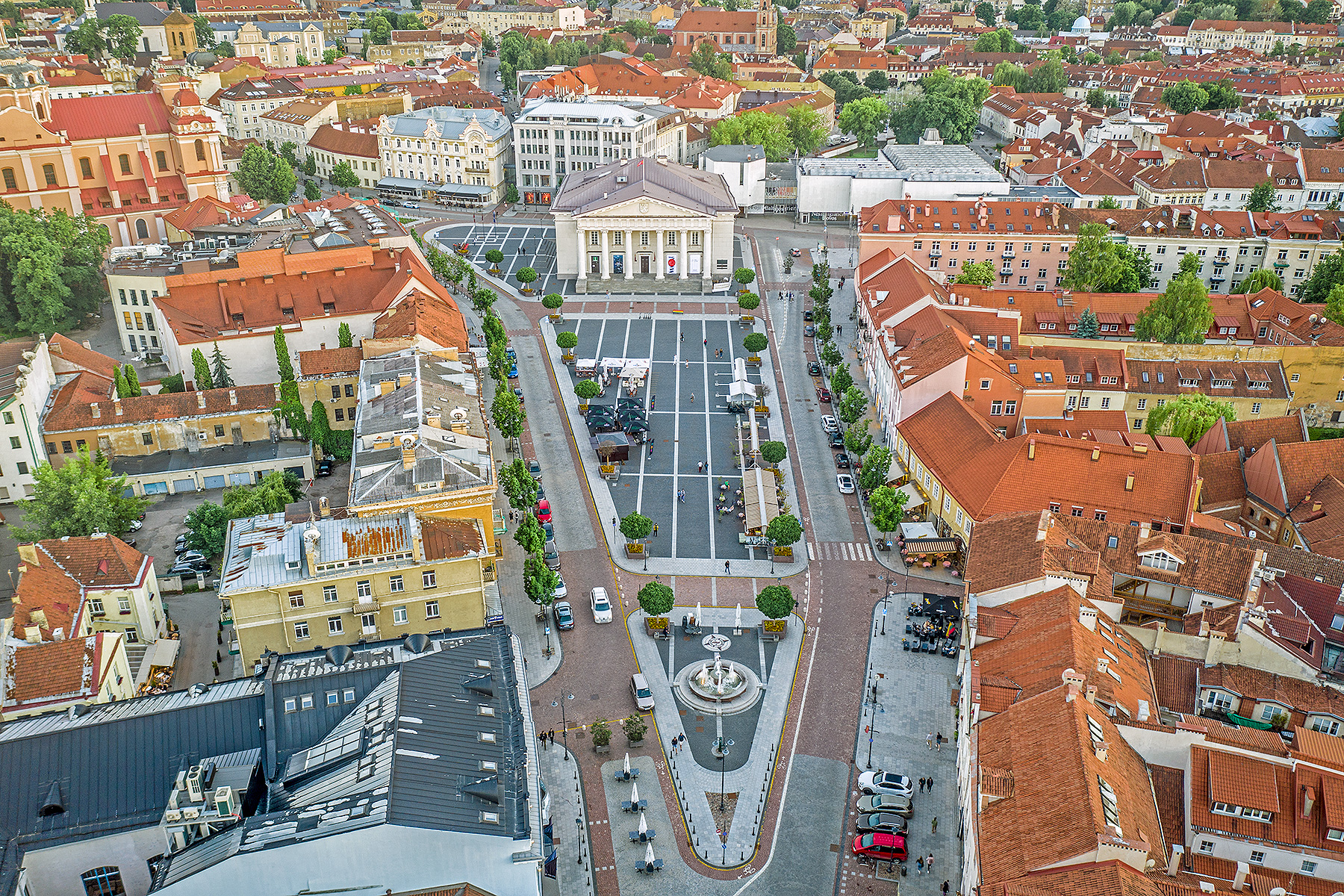
Aerial view in 2021

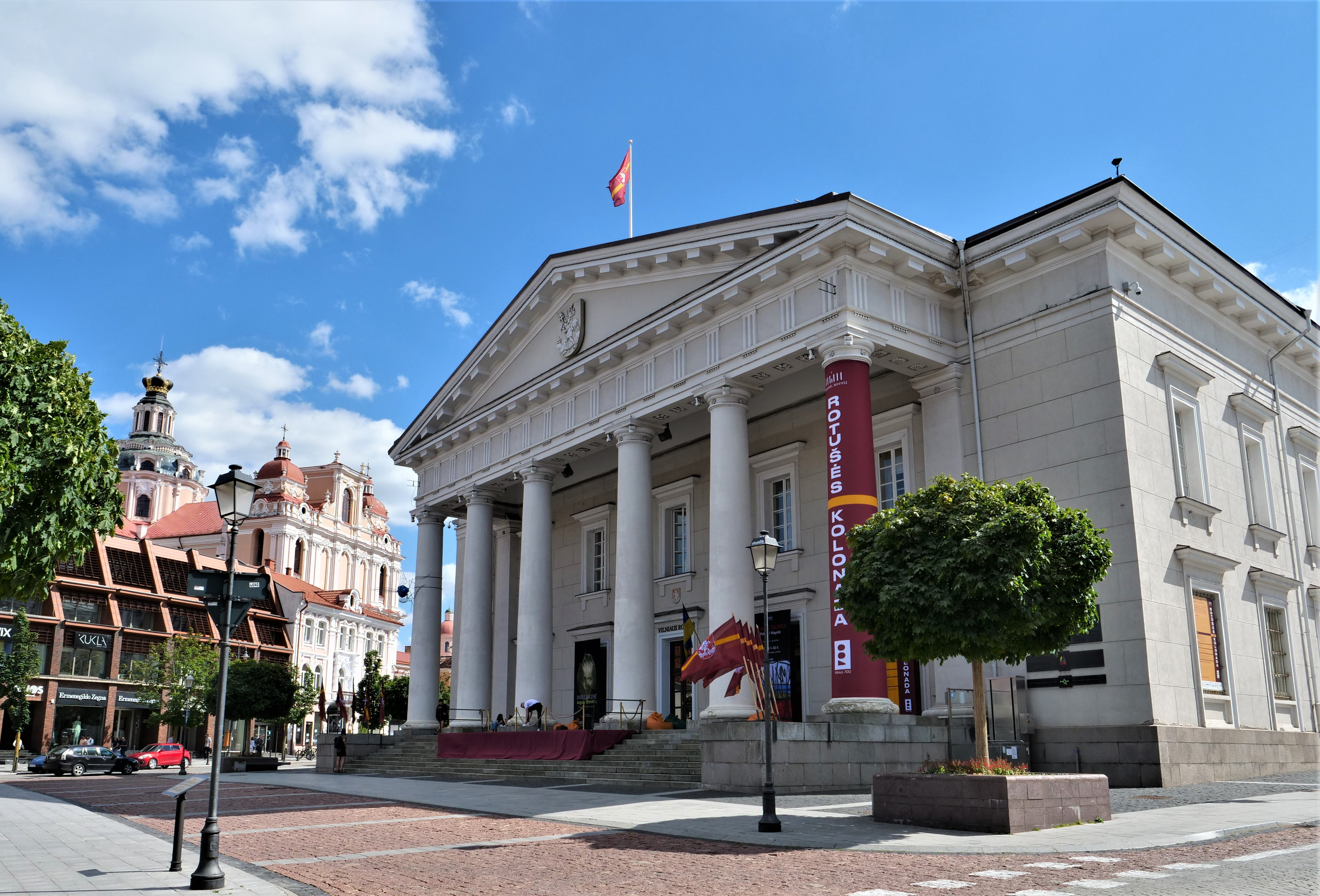
Façade, 2022

== See also ==
- Vilnius City Municipality Building
