= 1738 in architecture =

== Events ==
- William Kent is appointed to remodel Rousham House and gardens in Oxfordshire, England, "a landmark in the history of the Romantic movement."

== Buildings and structures ==
=== Buildings ===
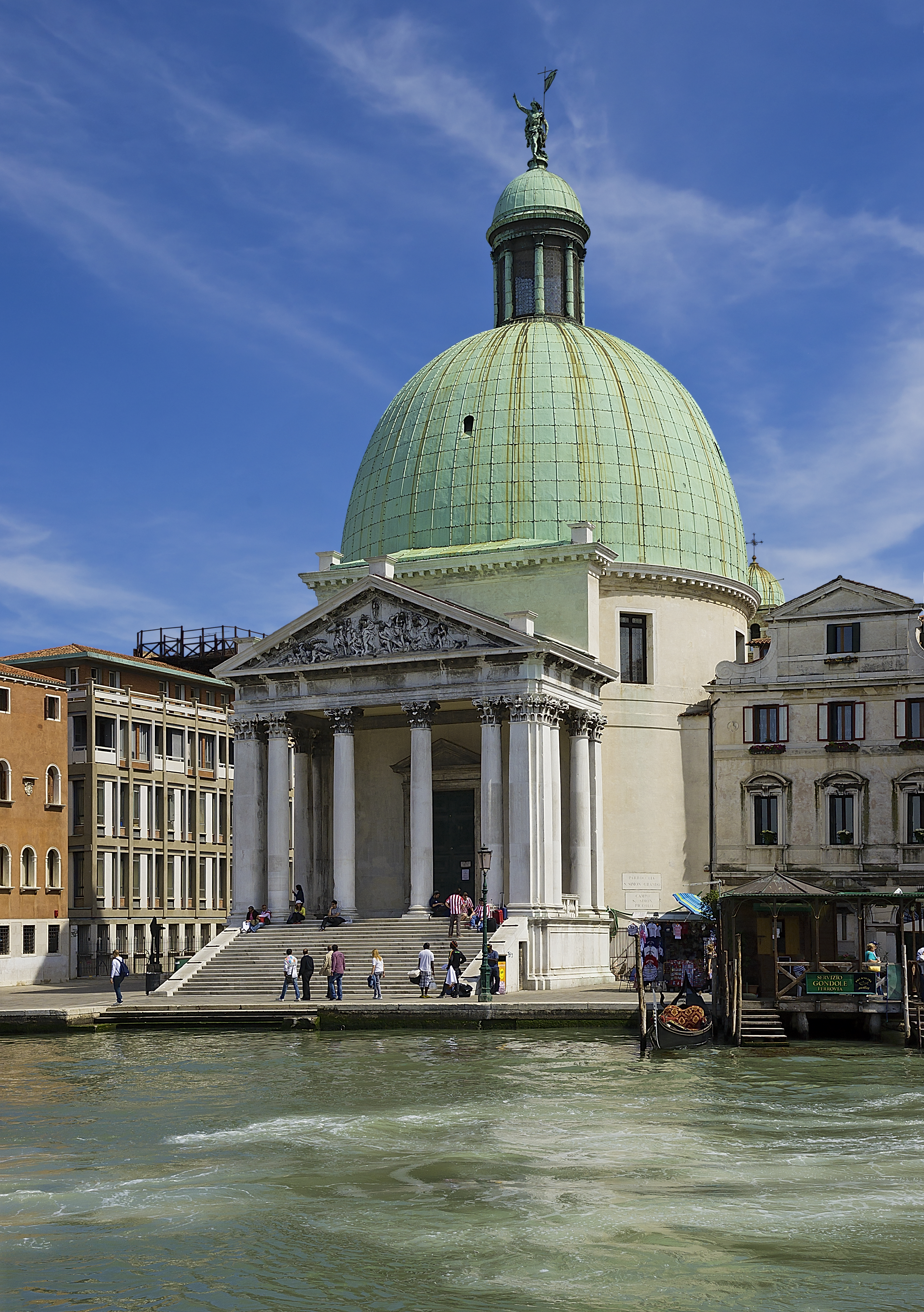
San Simeone Piccolo

- Château de Bagnolet, Paris.
- San Simeone Piccolo on the Grand Canal (Venice), designed by Giovanni Antonio Scalfarotto, completed.
- Iglesia de Nuestra Señora de la Palma, Algeciras, Spain, designed by Alonso Barranco and completed by Isidro Casaus.
- Welsh Charity School, Clerkenwell, London, designed by James Steer.
- Residenz Ansbach reconstruction completed by Leopold Retti.

== Publications ==
- Giovanni Niccolò Servandoni – Description abregée de l'eglise Saint Pierre de Rome (Paris)

== Births ==
- Matvey Kazakov, Russian neoclassical architect (died 1812)
- Approximate date – John Palmer of Bath, English architect (died 1817)

== Deaths ==
- January 20 – Francesco Galli Bibiena, Italian architect, designer and painter (born 1659)
- March 16 – George Bähr, German architect; designer of Protestant churches (born 1666)
- Date unknown – Francis Smith of Warwick, English architect (born 1672)
