= Tommaso Temanza =

Italian architect and author

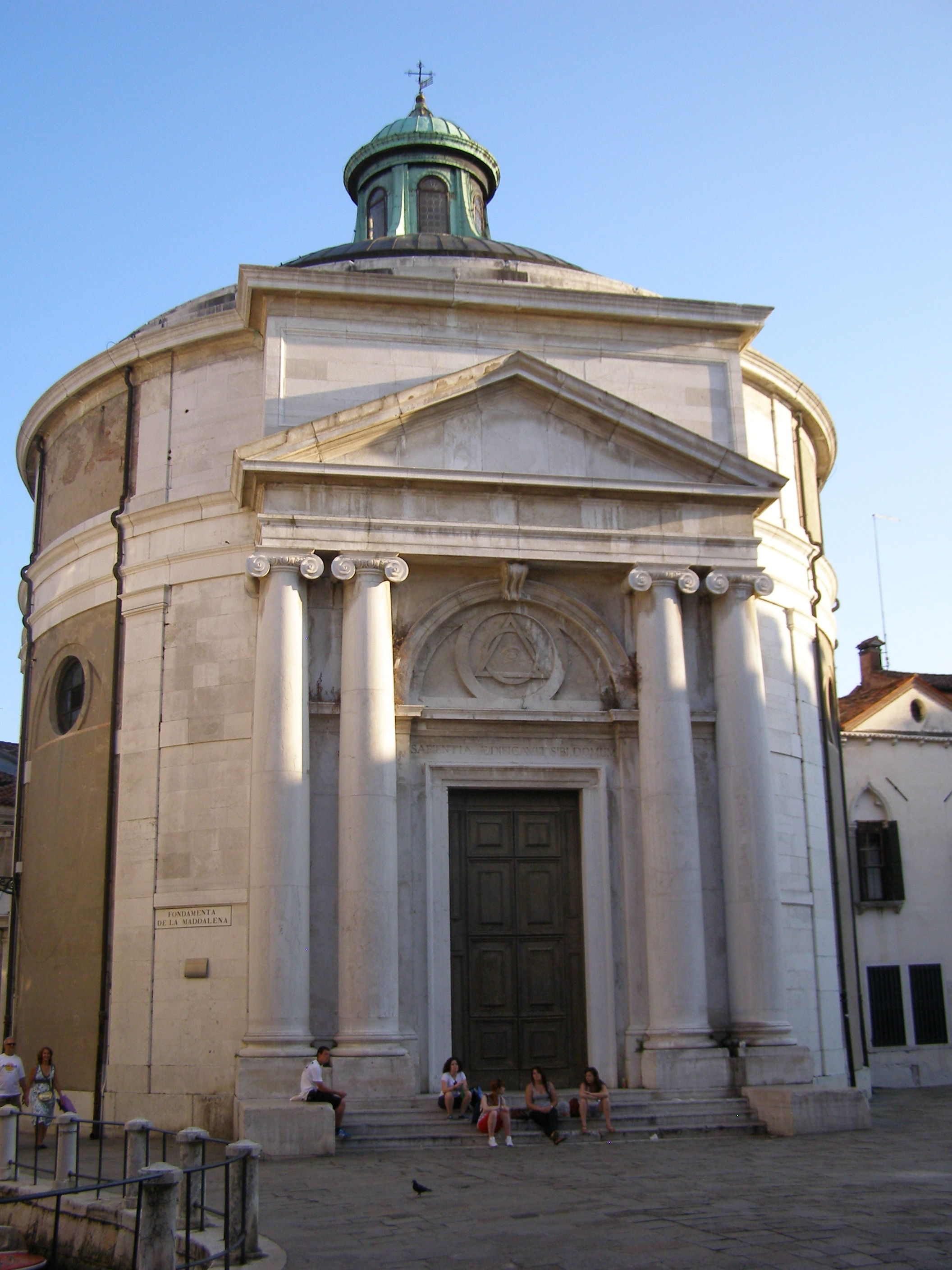
- La Maddalena, Venice
- Born: 9 March 1705; Venice, Republic of Venice
- Died: 14 June 1789 (aged 84); Venice, Republic of Venice
- Education: University of Padua
- Occupations: Architect, art historian
- Known for: La Maddalena, Venice
- Parent(s): Antonio Temanza and Adriana Temanza (née Scalfarotto)

Tommaso Temanza (9 March 1705 – 14 June 1789) was an Italian architect and author of the Neoclassic period. Born in Venice, he was active both in his natal city and the mainland towns of the Republic of Venice. His works include the church of Santa Margherita (circa 1748) in Padua; the private chapel on the grounds of Villa Contarini located in Piazzola sul Brenta; and a loggia for Ca' Zenobio degli Armeni in Venice. His masterpieces are however for churches in Venice, including the cylindrical church of Santa Maria Maddalena (where his remains rest), the church of San Servolo and the chapel Sagredo in San Francesco della Vigna. The abandoned project for the facade of Ca' Sagredo in Venice. Temanza is known also for his biography of architects from Venice: Vite dei più celebri architetti e scrittori veneziani (1778).

== Biography ==
=== Early life and education ===
Tommaso Temanza was born in Venice on 9 March 1705. His father, Antonio Temanza, was an architect, as was his uncle, Giovanni Antonio Scalfarotto, with whom he trained and who designed San Simeone Piccolo (1718–38), a building that has been described as a ‘blending of the Pantheon with Byzantium and Palladio’. The construction of this church must have coincided with Temanza’s apprenticeship, and it provided him with an early introduction to a peculiarly Venetian strain of Neoclassicism. He also studied mathematics under Andreas Musalus, professor at Venice University, and later with the renowned mathematician Giovanni Poleni at the University of Padua. He always felt indebted to Poleni, referring to him as ‘il mio dilettissimo precettore’ (Vite, 1966). In Venice he studied hydraulics with the celebrated Bernardino Zendrini, who, like his other tutors, was knowledgeable in architecture. Temanza’s work reflected the scientific bias of his training: in writing his Vite he was keenly aware of the need for verification, and he adopted the relatively modern practice of consulting original documents for this purpose.

=== Early career ===
Temanza’s earliest architectural work in Venice was a lavabo in San Simeone Piccolo (1729). In 1735 he accompanied Scalfarotto to Rimini, where he undertook a study of the local antiquities, later publishing his findings in Delle antichità di Rimino (1741). By 1738, the date he recorded on its cover, he was keeping a commonplace book, or zibaldone, the manuscript of which, entitled ‘Zibaldon de’ memorie storiche appartenenti a’ professori delle belle arti del disegno’, is in the library of the Seminario Patriarcale in Venice. It contains the information that Temanza noted down throughout most of his life on contemporary artists (the last entry, on Piranesi, was made in 1778), together with his numerous revisions and corrections. There are four further zibaldoni (also in the library of the Seminario Patriarcale), of a different format, in which he recorded facts relevant to his work as a hydraulic engineer, as well as information destined for his Vite of 1778.

In 1742 Temanza was appointed inspector at the Magistrato delle Acque, and in 1747 he was commissioned to reconstruct the bridge at Bassano; he attempted to restore it to its original Palladian form, but, tired of criticism and burdened with other commitments, he finally ceded the work to the mathematician Bartolomeo Ferracina.

=== Mature work ===
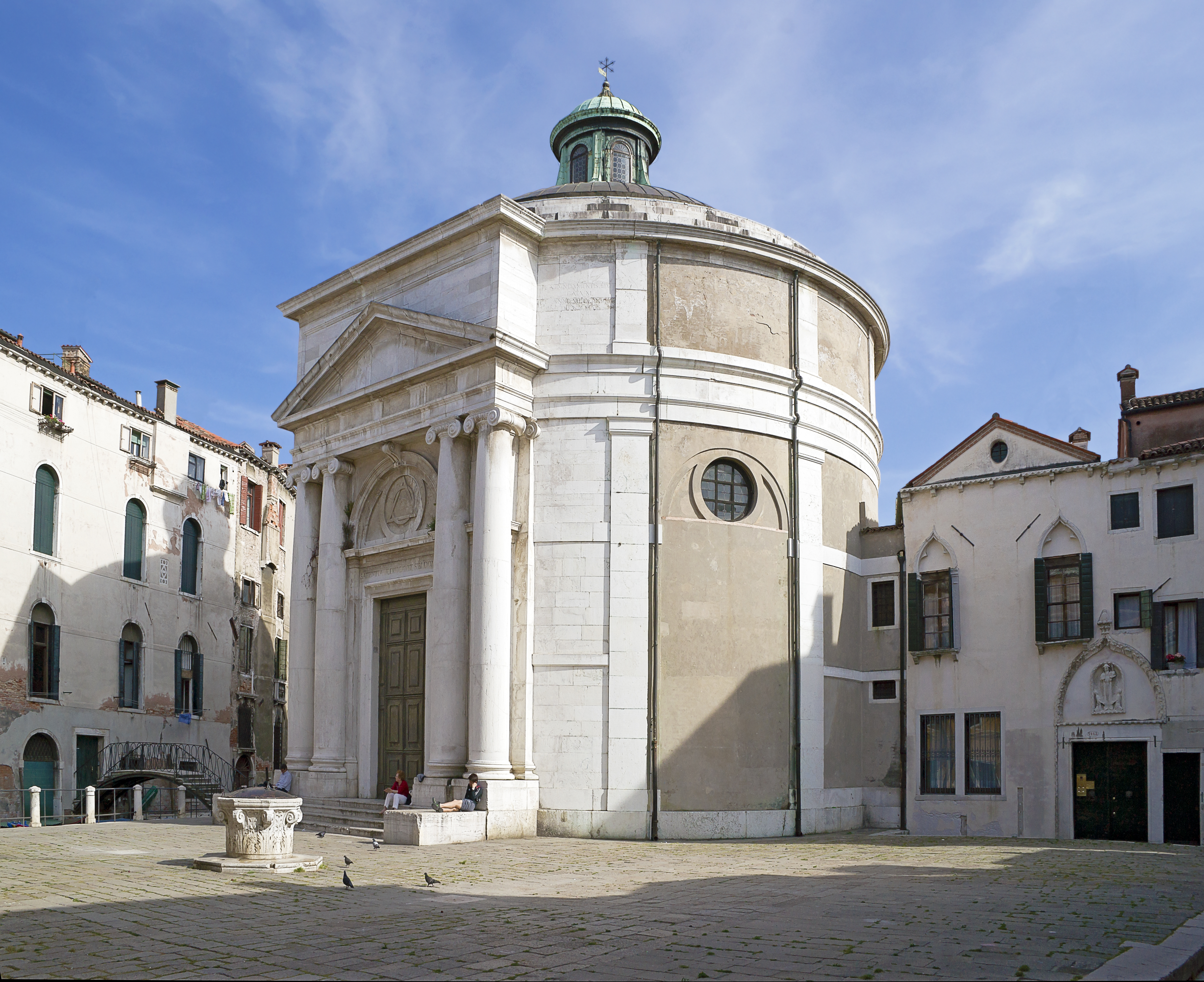
Church of Santa Maria Maddalena in Venice

Temanza's first major building in Venice was Santa Maria Maddalena, which scholars have variously dated to 1748 (Thieme–Becker), 1748–63 and 1763. According to Grassi, 1760 was the date of the project, construction was begun in 1763 and the church was almost completed by 1778. It is a small, domed, circular structure deriving ultimately from the Pantheon but with reference to Scalfarotto’s San Simeone Piccolo. Its most direct inspiration, however, is Palladio’s chapel of the Redeemer (Tempietto Barbaro) at Maser (1579–80). It is set back in a small campo and, in keeping with the limited space available, is in a more restrained classical style than Scalfarotto’s church. There was no room for a portico: two pairs of unfluted half columns support the pediment above the entrance. The exterior of the cylinder is without ornament except for two horizontal bands of moulding, which emphasize the church’s taut circularity. Inside, the ‘inner wall of the cylinder moves with a regular rhythm of column, arched recess, niche, column and so on… strongly reminiscent of Palladio, even down to the bichromatic colour scheme’.

About 1750 Temanza rebuilt the façade of the little church of Santa Margherita in Padua. In the 1760s he made two journeys to Rome, the second (in 1767 ) to advise Pope Clement XIII on controlling the flooding of the River Reno, which was damaging papal territories. In the course of these visits he met Giovanni Gaetano Bottari, scholar and connoisseur, and the architect and theoretician Francesco Milizia, who regarded him as the best architect of his time. Temanza’s correspondence with these two friends and, above all, with the great French collector and connoisseur Pierre-Jean Mariette (to whom he sent drawings, engravings, recent books and art-historical information) provides an important source for art historians.

Around 1765–7 Temanza was involved in building the bridge at Dolo on the Brenta, and in the early 1770s he fulfilled his last full-scale commission as an architect: the garden pavilion (described by Howard as the gardener’s house; now used as a library) at the Ca' Zenobio degli Armeni, Venice. The graceful simplicity of this pavilion, a simple, rectangular structure with an elegant loggia, influenced his most talented pupil, Gian Antonio Selva, who was later to design the Teatro La Fenice (1790–92). In 1769 he was elected a member of the Académie royale d'architecture of Paris.

=== Vite ===
In 1778 Temanza’s Vite dei più celebri architetti e scultori was published. It was the first collection of biographies by an art historian to focus on the architects and sculptors of Venice. Containing a great deal of information presented with a painstaking respect for accuracy, it has always been regarded as an invaluable source-book. It is in two parts, the first devoted to the 15th-century artists whom Temanza saw as precursors to the ‘Golden Age’: Francesco Colonna (1433–1527), Fra Giovanni Giocondo, Pietro Lombardo, Bartolomeo Bon, Antonio Abbondi, Tullio Lombardo and others; the second, on the great 16th-century masters: Michele Sanmicheli, Jacopo Sansovino, Pietro di Giacomo Cataneo, Vincenzo Scamozzi, Alessandro Vittoria, Antonio da Ponte and Girolamo Campagna, with, as its culmination, the life and work of Palladio (the sections on Sansovino, Palladio and Scamozzi were revised versions of the individual lives he had published earlier, in 1752, 1762 and 1770 respectively).

=== Later years ===
The final years of Temanza’s life were devoted to scholarship. In 1781 he published the results of his research into the history and topography of his city, in the form of a commentary on an early map: Antica pianta dell[a] …città di Venezia. Temanza died in Venice on 14 June 1789.

== Works ==
- Vite dei più celebri architetti e scultori veneziani che fiorirono nel secolo decimosesto (Venice, 1778); ed. L. Grassi (Milan, 1966) [with intro., critical assessment and index]
- Antica pianta dell'inclita città di Venezia (in Italian). Venezia: Carlo Palese. 1781.

== Gallery ==
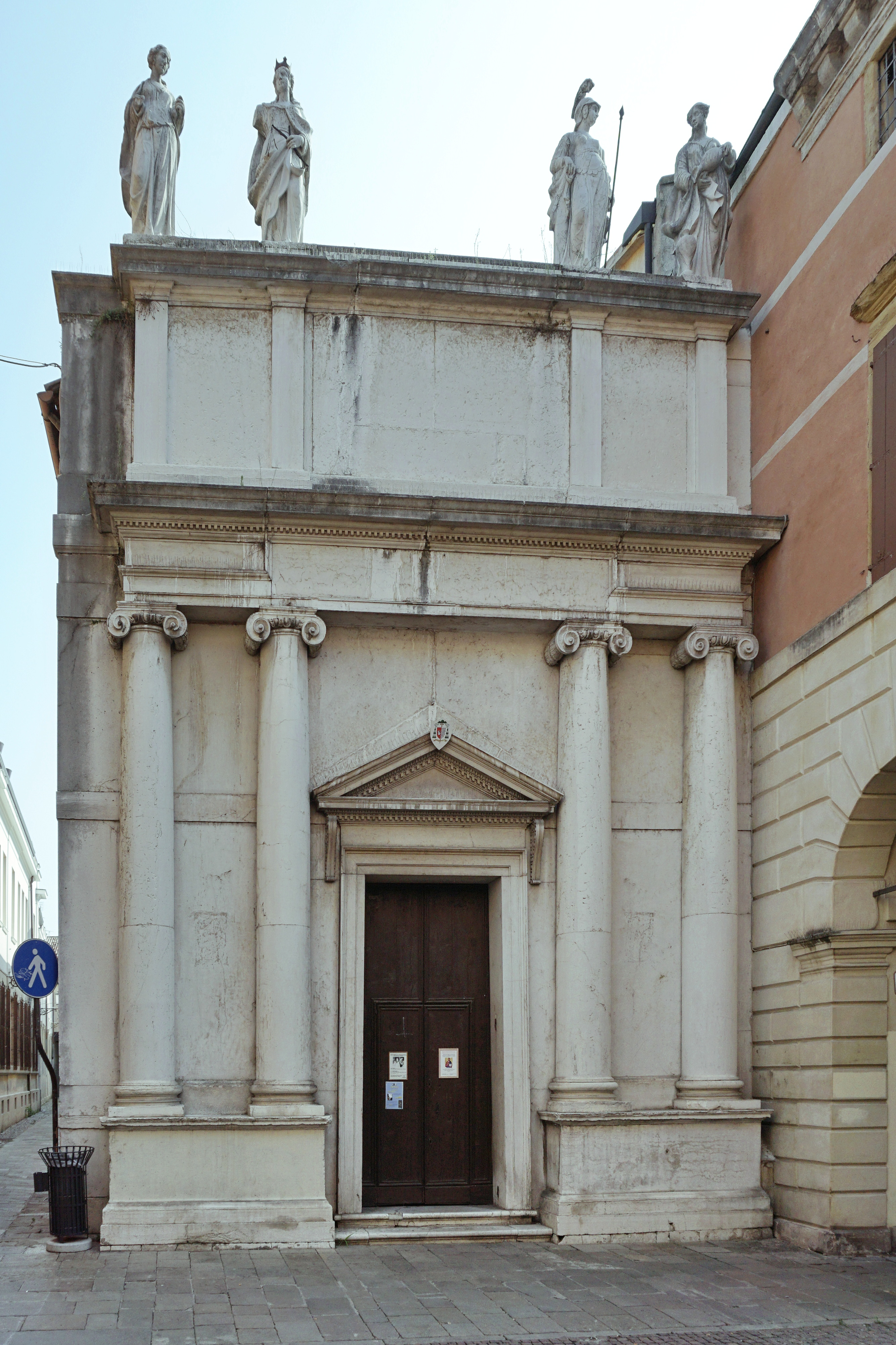
Chiesa di Santa Margherita, Padua

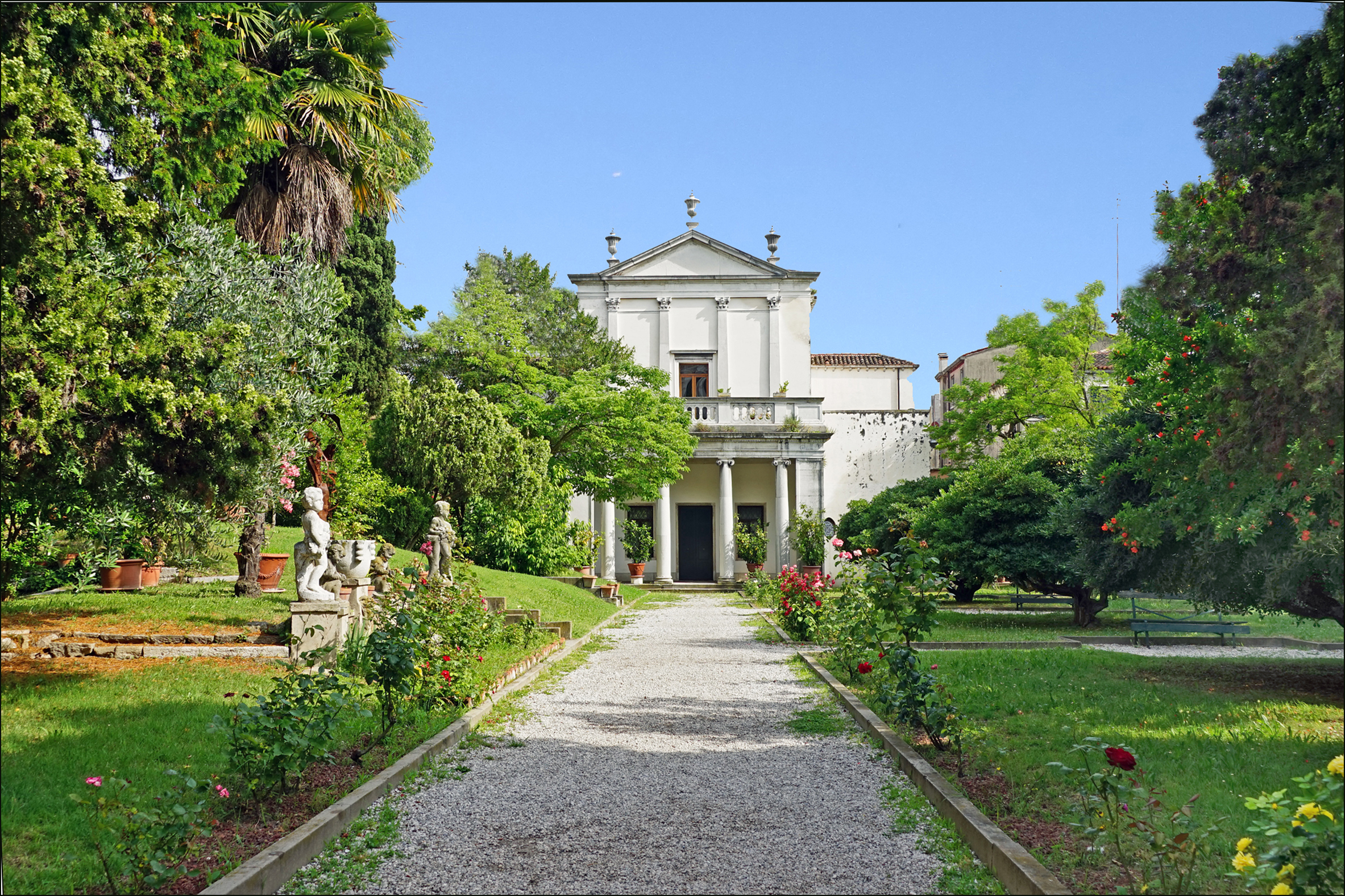
Gardener's house, Ca' Zenobio degli Armeni

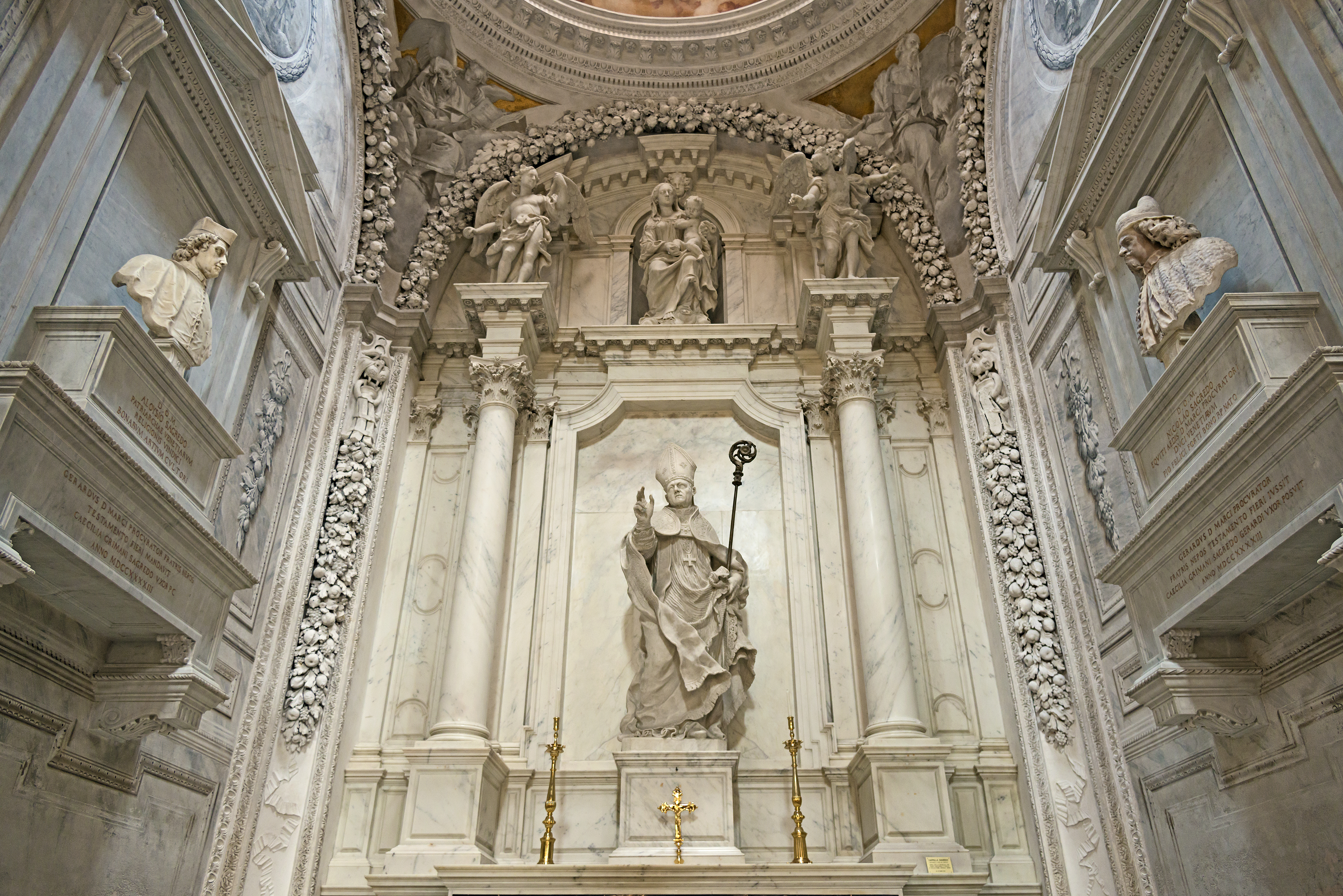
The Sagredo chapel San Francesco della Vigna

== Sources ==
Notes

Bibliography

- Negri, Francesco (1830). Notizie intorno alla Persona e all'Opere di Tommaso Temanza Architetto Veneziano. Venice: Tipografia Fracasso.
- Wittkower, Rudolf (1958). "Art and Architecture in Italy, 1600–1750". The Pelican History of Art. Harmondsworth: Penguin Books. pp. 253, 387.
- Nicola Ivanoff, ed. (1963). Tommaso Temanza: Zibaldon. Venice and Rome: Istituto per la collaborazione Culturale.
- Meeks, Carroll L. V. (1966). Italian Architecture, 1750–1914. New Haven and London: Yale University Press. pp. 171–4.
- Granuzzo, Elena (2019). "TEMANZA, Tommaso". Dizionario Biografico degli Italiani (in Italian). Vol. 95: Taranto–Togni. Rome: Istituto dell'Enciclopedia Italiana. ISBN 978-88-12-00032-6.
