= 1812 in architecture =

The year 1812 in architecture involved some significant events.

== Buildings and structures ==
=== Buildings ===
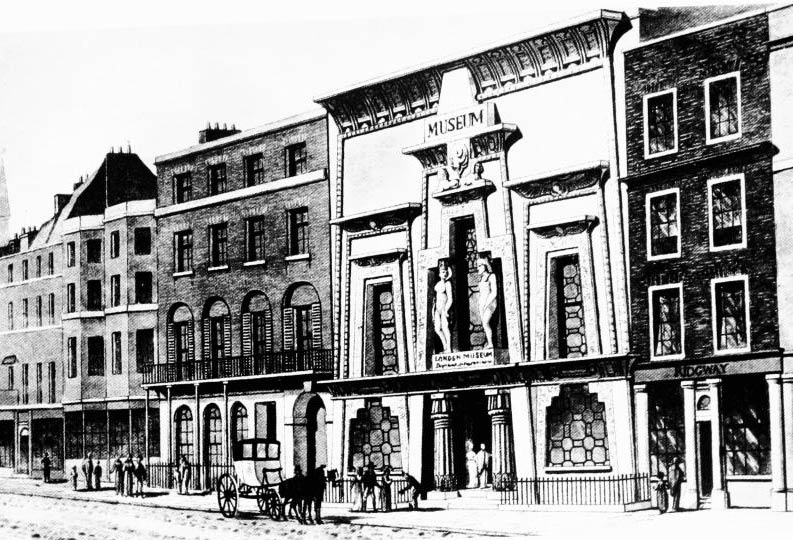
London's Egyptian Hall when new

- July 6 – The Laigh Milton Viaduct, built to carry the Kilmarnock and Troon Railway in Scotland, is officially opened.
- October 10 – The Theatre Royal, Drury Lane, in London, designed by Benjamin Dean Wyatt, the fourth theatre on the site, hosts its first production.
- Original Scottish Law Courts, Edinburgh, designed by Robert Reid, completed.
- Custom House, Leith, Edinburgh, designed by Robert Reid, completed.
- HM Prison Perth, Scotland, designed by Robert Reid, completed.
- The original Breidenbacher Hof hotel in Düsseldorf, Germany, opens to the public. (It is destroyed by bombing in 1943 and later rebuilt at a different location.)
- The Egyptian Hall in Piccadilly, London, designed by P. F. Robinson, is completed (demolished in 1905).
- St. John's Cathedral (Belize City) is completed, the first church to be built in the colony of British Honduras.
- The Flag Tower of Hanoi is completed.
- Temple of Diana, Valtice, Moravia, designed by Joseph Hardtmuth, is built.
- The Mahmoudiya Mosque in Jaffa, modern-day Israel, is completed.
- Castle Cottage, Newport-on-Tay, Scotland, is built.

== Awards ==
- Grand Prix de Rome, architecture: Tilman-François Suys.

== Publications ==
- William Adam's Vitruvius Scoticus is published posthumously by his grandson William Adam of Blair Adam in Edinburgh.

== Births ==
- January 10 – Georg Hermann Nicolai, German architect and academic (died 1881)
- March 1 – Augustus Pugin, English Gothic Revival architect, designer, artist and critic (died 1852)
- March 2 – Samuel Sanders Teulon, English Gothic Revival architect (died 1873)
- July 21 – Robert William Billings, British Gothic Revival architectural draughtsman and architect (died 1874)
- September 8 – Matthew Ellison Hadfield, English Gothic Revival architect (died 1885)
- September 13 – John McMurtry, American builder and architect (died 1890)
- October 21 – Richard Cromwell Carpenter, English Gothic Revival architect (died 1855)
- November 9 – Paul Abadie, French architect and building restorer (died 1884)

== Deaths ==
- January 9 bapt. – Eduard van der Nüll, Viennese architect (suicide 1868)
- November 7 – Matvey Kazakov, Russian neoclassical architect (born 1738)
- date unknown – Cosimo Morelli, Italian neoclassical architect (born 1732)
