= Francesco Penso =

Italian sculptor (c. 1665 – 1737)

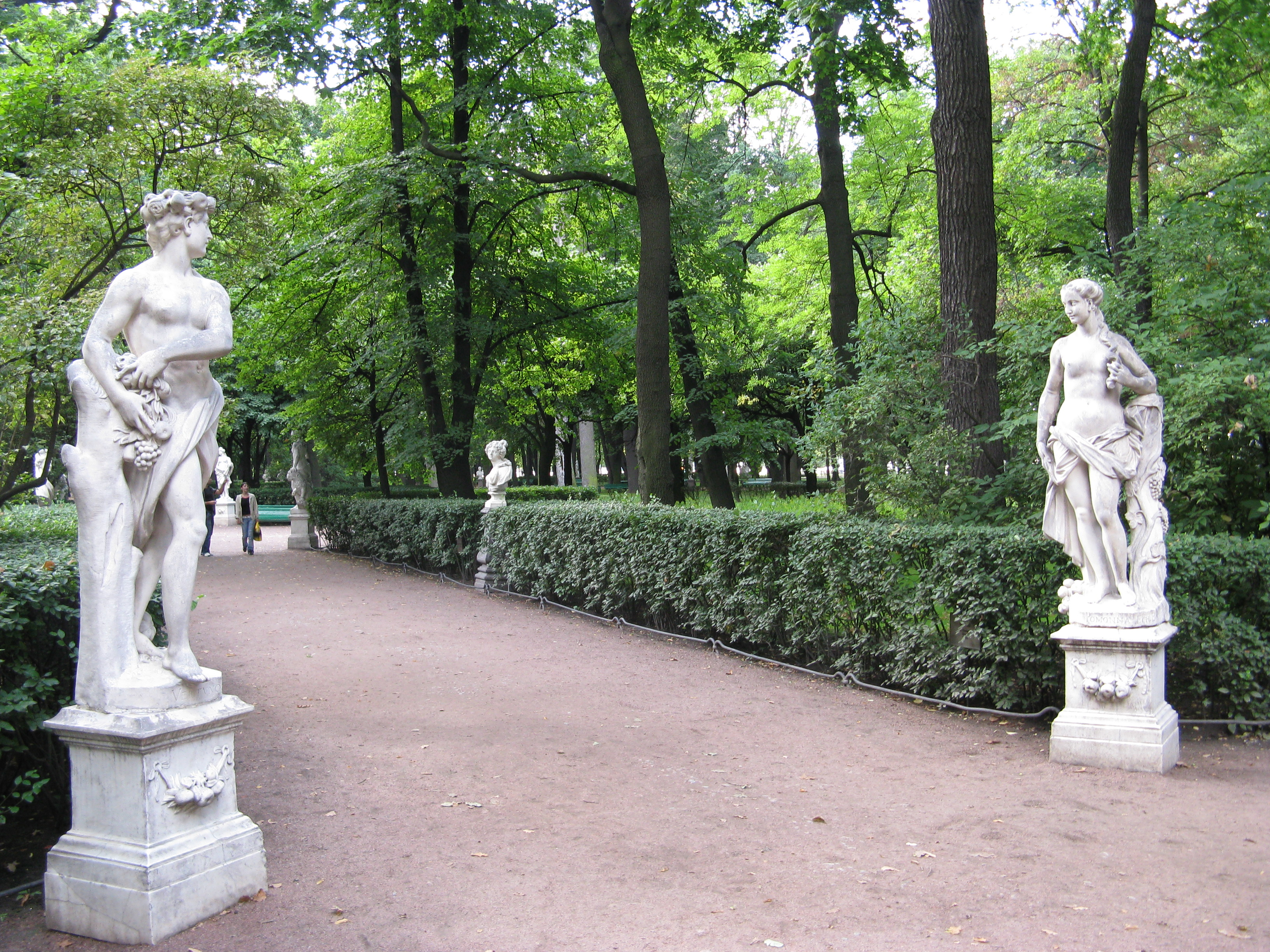
Vertumnus and Pomona (1717) in an allée of Peter the Great's Summer Garden, St. Petersburg

Francesco Penso called "Cabianca" (1665? — 1737) was an Italian sculptor. His earliest known work is the marble St. Benedict (1695) for San Michele in Isola, Venice. His best-known work is the reliquary (1711), with bas-reliefs of the Crucifixion, Deposition of Christ and the Pietà, for the sacristy in the Basilica di Santa Maria Gloriosa dei Frari, Venice.

Penso was born and died in Venice. He spent the decade 1698–1708 in Dalmatia, where he provided sculptures for the high altar with Saints John, Dominic, Bruno and Chiara for Santa Chiara, Cattaro (Kotor), an altar for San Giuseppe and the marble altar of the chapel of St. Tryfon, in San Trifone.

In Venice are his limestone Bellona, goddess of War, at the entrance to the Arsenal. In niches on the façade of the church of the Gesuiti are St. John the Evangelist and St. James with St. Andrew atop the balustrade. His bas-relief of the martyrdoms of the patron saints fills the tympanum of Santi Simeone e Giuda. On the staircase of the Seminario Patriarcale are bas-relief panels illustrating Jacob's Dream and the Vision of the Orphan. The Martyrdom of the Saints in the Church San Simeone Piccolo

Several of his life-size marble figures are in the Summer Garden, St. Petersburg: a Saturn, Vertumnus and Pomona (1717), an Antinous (1722).
