= La Maddalena, Venice =

Church building in Venice, Italy

La Maddalena
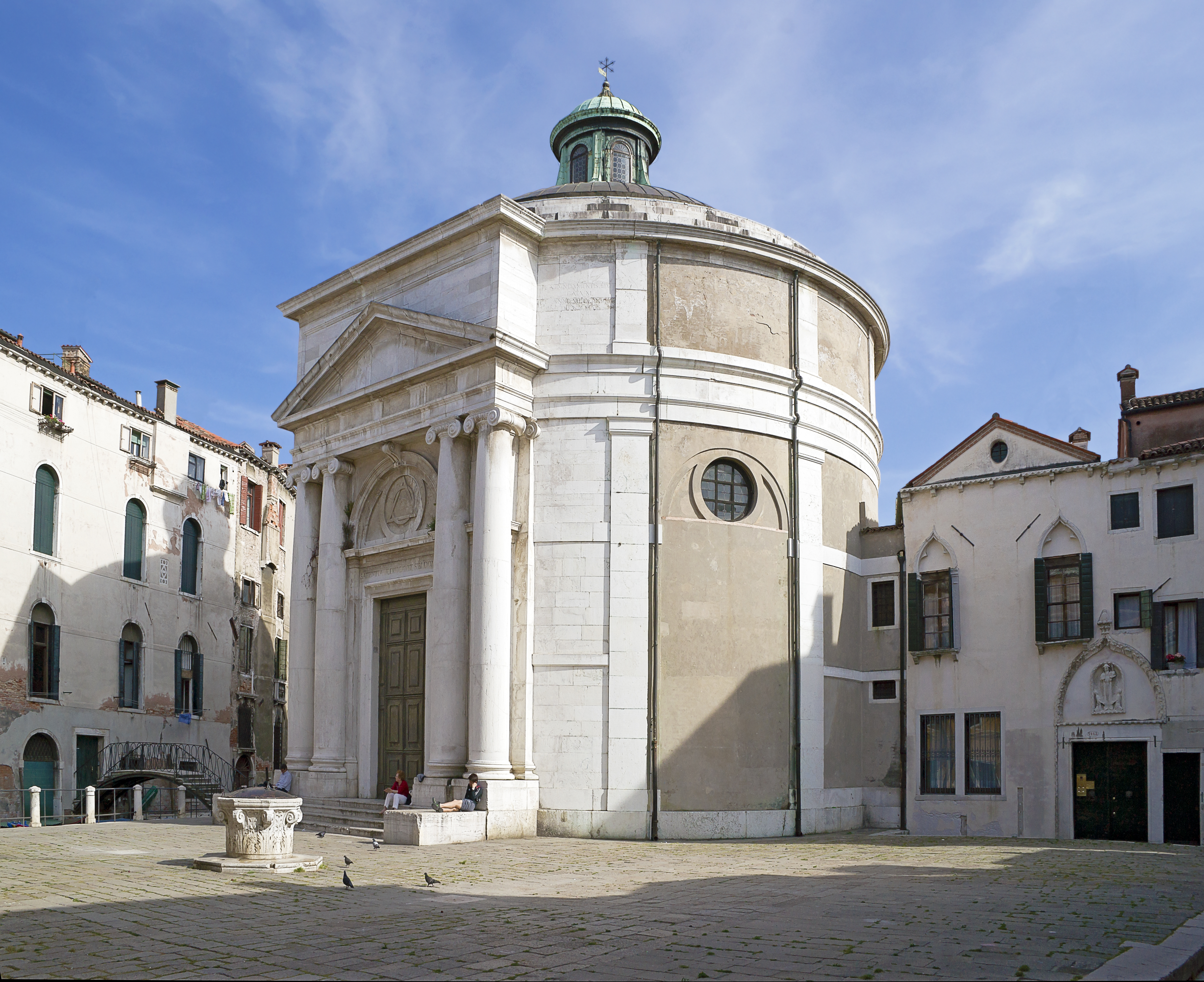

- Location within Venice Location within Italy

Religion
- Affiliation: Roman Catholic
- Province: Venice

Location
- Location: Venice, Italy
- Interactive map of La Maddalena
- Coordinates: 45.4429°N 12.3311°E

Architecture
- Completed: 1780

La Maddalena (Italian: Santa Maria Maddalena in Cannaregio, usually referred to simply as La Maddalena) is a church in Venice, Italy, in the sestiere of Cannaregio.

A religious edifice is known in the site as early as 1222, owned by the Balbo patrician family. When, in the mid-14th century, the Venetian Senate established a public holiday for Mary Magdalene's feast, it was decided to enlarge the church, including a watchtower which was turned into a bell tower.

The church was restored in the early 18th century, but in 1780 it was entirely rebuilt under design by Tommaso Temanza, with a circular plan inspired by the Pantheon in Rome. The bell tower was demolished in 1888. The most notable feature is the portal, with masonic symbols over the door (probably connected to the Balbo's membership in the Knights Templar). The interior has an hexagonal plan with four side chapels and a presbytery.

Outside the apse is a 15th-century basrelief of the Madonna with Child.
