= Villa Contarini =

Villa in Piazzola sul Brenta, Padova, Italy

Coordinates: 45°32′39″N 11°47′07″E

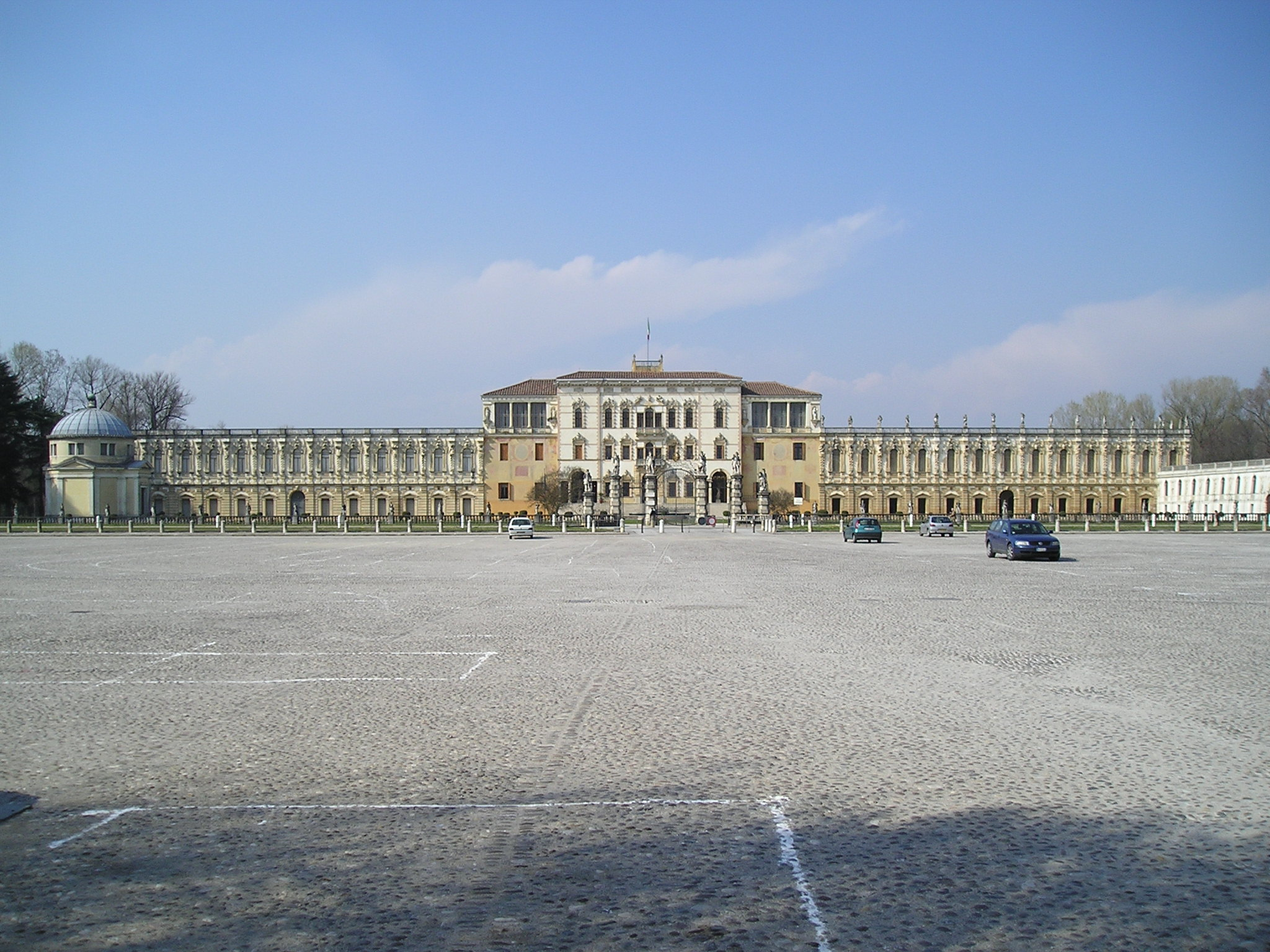
Villa Contarini in Piazzola sul Brenta

Villa Contarini is a mostly Baroque-style, patrician rural palace in Piazzola sul Brenta, province of Padova, in the region of the Veneto of northern Italy. The villa is spread over a 40 hectare area, with canals, and a lake. Now owned by the government of the region of Veneto, and administered through the Fondazione G. E. Ghirardi, the villa and gardens are available for touring as well as for sponsored cultural events.

== History ==
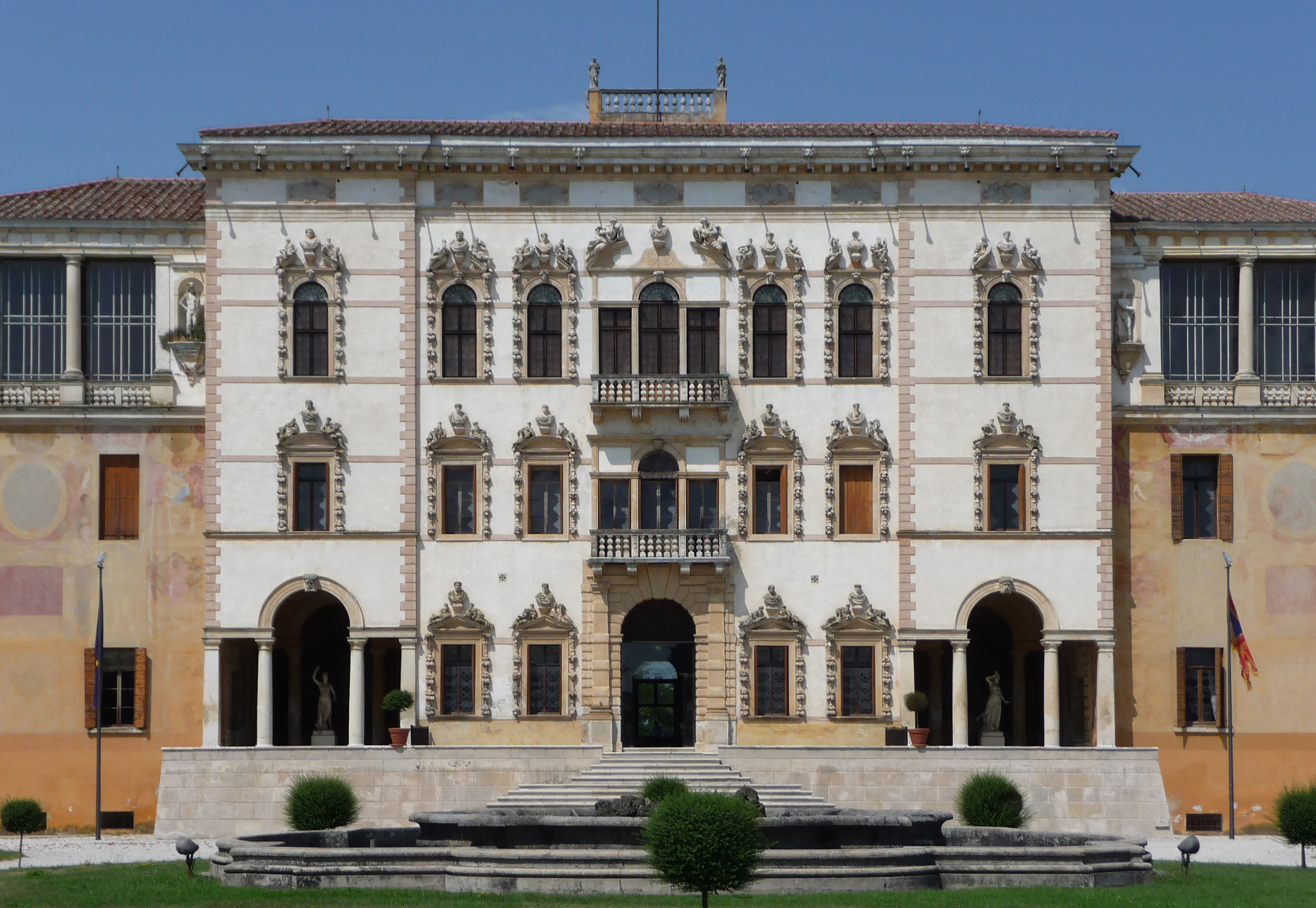
The main building

The main building (Villa padronale) was begun in 1546 under commission by the Venetian patricians Paolo and Francesco Contarini. It appears to have been built on the plinth of an older fortress like structure. While some documents claim the original design was by Andrea Palladio, this attribution is controversial. This core of the villa has a facade, oddly out of place in this open space, resembling a Gothic canal facade in Venice. The more elaborate flanking wings were commissioned by Marco Contarini between 1671 and 1676 extended the 16th century layout, building two large loggia wings at the sides of the previous main building, which are decorated with numerous telamon sculptures, extruding from the second story pilasters. The ground floor is more rusticated. The eastern wing was completed by the 17th century, but work on the western wing continued until 1900. The interiors of the west wing, however, were frescoed in 1684 by Michele Primon. The detached Neoclassical chapel in front of the main villa was designed by Tommaso Temanza. Finally, the villa links up across the street with a large porticoed hemicycle, only half-completed. It is evident in the layout of the complex drawn by Muttoni in 1760. This piazza, known as Anfiteatro Camerini is now commonly used for large outdoor concerts.

In his description of the glory days of Venetian villas, Pompeo Molmenti mentions Villa Piazzola:

The entertainments which the patricians gave on special occasions at their country places sometimes exceeded in splendor the famous fetes in the palaces of Venice. For example ... Procurator Marco Contarini gave a series of simply amazing theatrical performances in his villa at Piazzola. In November 1679, Dr. Piccioli's drama, "Le Amazzoni nelle isole Fortunate", set to music by Carlo Pallavicino, was staged; and the following year ... the "Berenice vendicativa", set to music by Domenico Freschi. Invitations were issued to princes, both foreign and Italian, to ambassadors, nobles, Venetian ladies and gentlemen of the mainland. The hall was capable of holding a thousand persons, and was lit with wax candles; the boxes were adorned with gilded stucco and mirrors, while on each side of the stage stood two great statues of elephants. The curtain was of crimson velvet with gold lace for the first performance and of gold-coloured velvet for the second. When the curtain rose, all the lights were extinguished in the hall, and the stage alone appeared brilliantly illuminated. There were three hundred performers, and coaches, triumphal cars, and as many as one hundred horses crowded the stage. Dr. Piccioli, a dependant of Contarini, has described with great minutiae the splendid fétes given at Piazzola on 7 August 1685, in honor of Ernest Augustus, Duke of Brunswick...he was received under triumphal arches, while forty Swiss Guards, in red and green, and as many carabineers were drawn up in the entrance hall...the cantatas and serenades (Vaticinio della Fortuna, La Schiavitu fortunata di Nettuno, II Rittratto della gloria, II Preludio felice, II Merito acclamato) were played during the fetes which occupied the three days of the Duke's stay... On the wide canals round the palace was an imitation of the Bucintoro, on which supper was served to the sound of music; Neptune and other deities were borne about on sea monsters, from whose open mouths spurted scented waters. The splendors of the palace amazed the Duke, who paid a visit to the musical library, the collection of instruments, the Conservatory, the printing-press, the church, and the theater. At the close of a great banquet there descended from the ceiling the representation of some monster of the air; it moved its head, claws, and tail, and came forward on its wings till it reached the middle of the hall, and was "a wonderful sight to see." There was a sham naval fight, too, between the Venetian and the Turkish galleys, races of barebacked horses, concerts, balls, serenades, and other brave shows.

He goes on to depict the naumachia or sea-battle, carried out on the great fish-ponds of the villa:

about half-past four, and found the great lake all lit up and with the Bucintoro in the middle with its velvet draperies and its coat of arms. I entered the palace and found twenty chambers all furnished regally. I went on board the Bucintoro with many nobles; towards the lake was a garden, where (upwards of 36) girls were singing a serenade. The conductor was Don Paolo, Master of the Conservatoire at the Ospedalleto; he saw me and beckoned me into the choir... with a great variety of instruments. After that two ships appeared, followed by two others covered with stucco; and they fought, and the stucco-covered ships were forced on shore. In the Bucintoro was a sunk place, very deep, all set round with an infinite display of silver bowls; in it was an orchestra of twenty-four, with trumpets and other instruments, who played up to one o'clock in the morning.

== Images ==
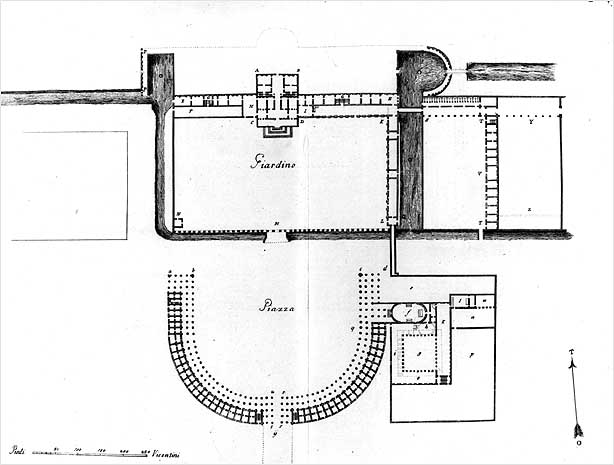
Layout of the villa complex (drawing by Muttoni, 1760)

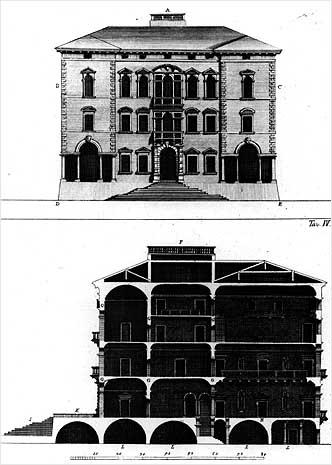
Front and section of the main building of the villa (drawing by Francesco Muttoni, 1760)

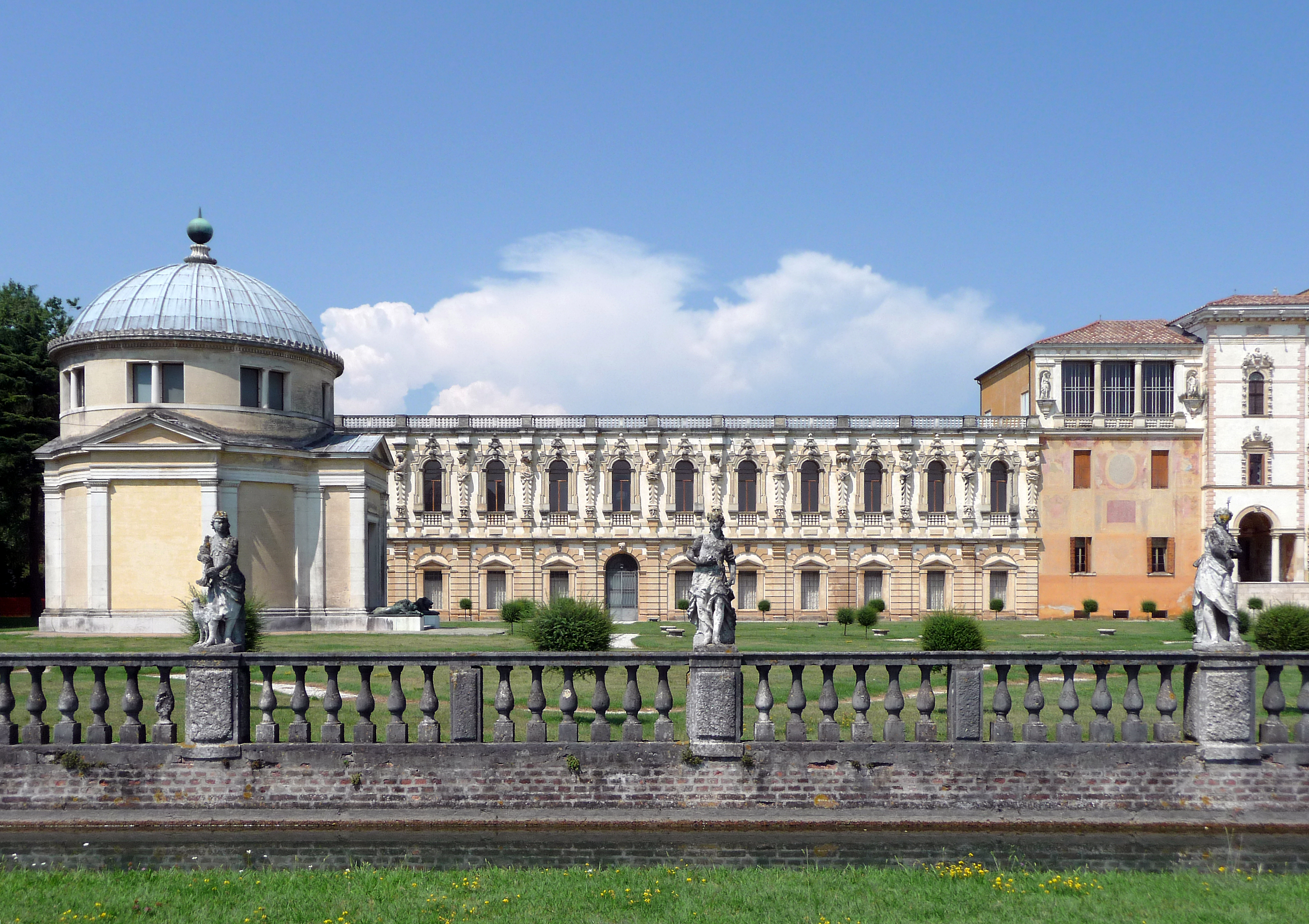
The left wing (in the background); at left, the chapel, designed by Tommaso Temanza

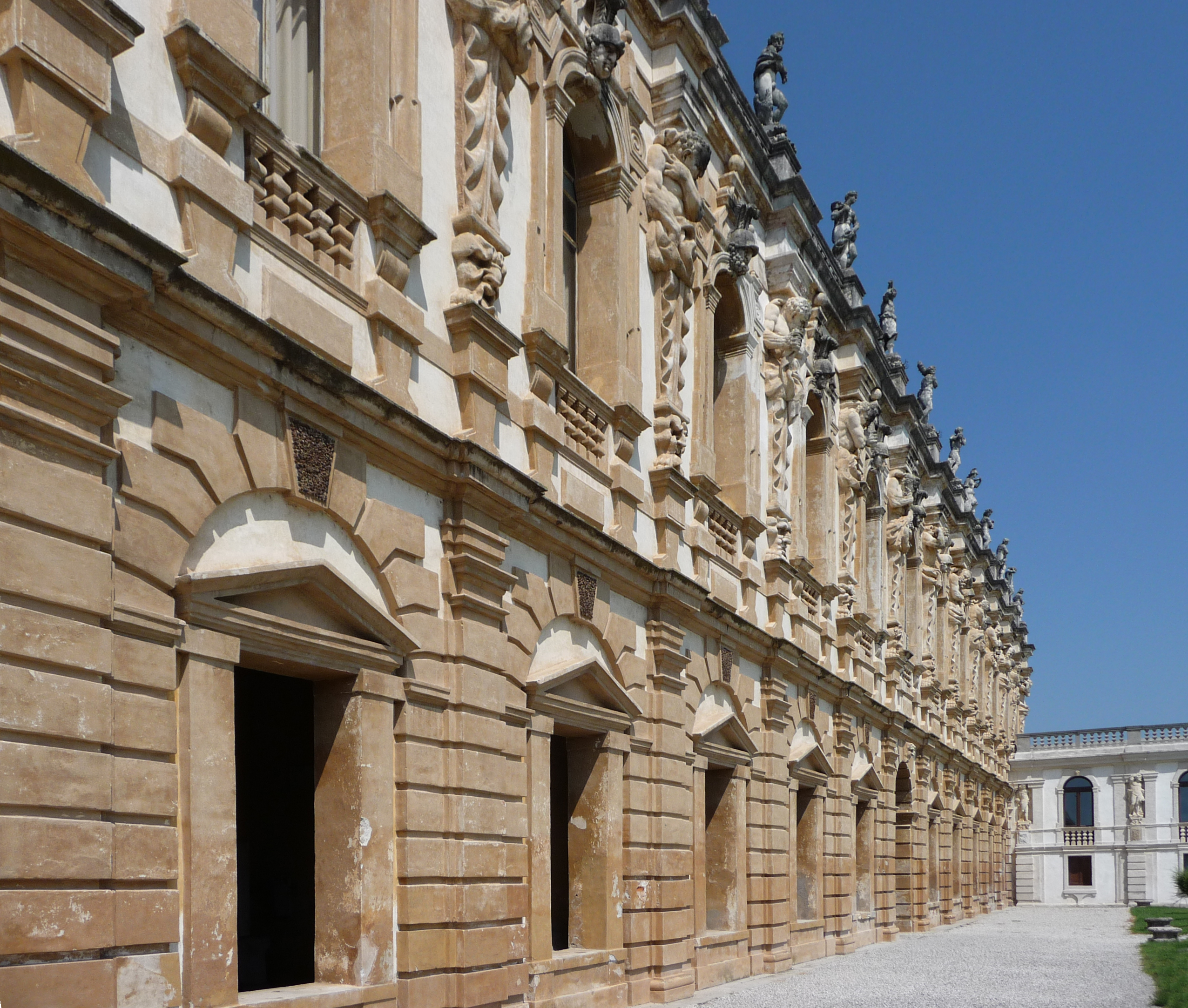
The barchessa (right wing)

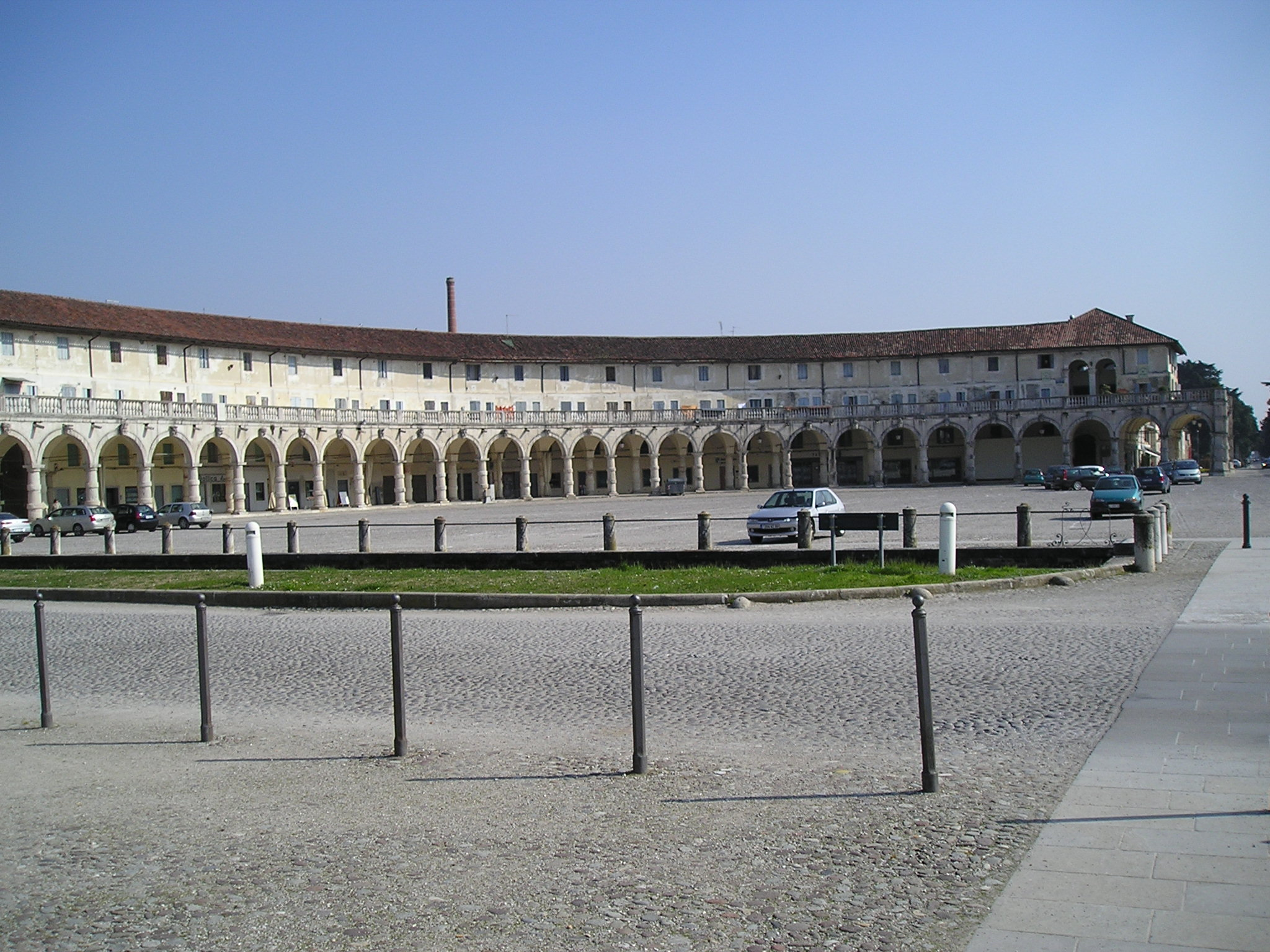
The porticoed hemicycle of the piazza

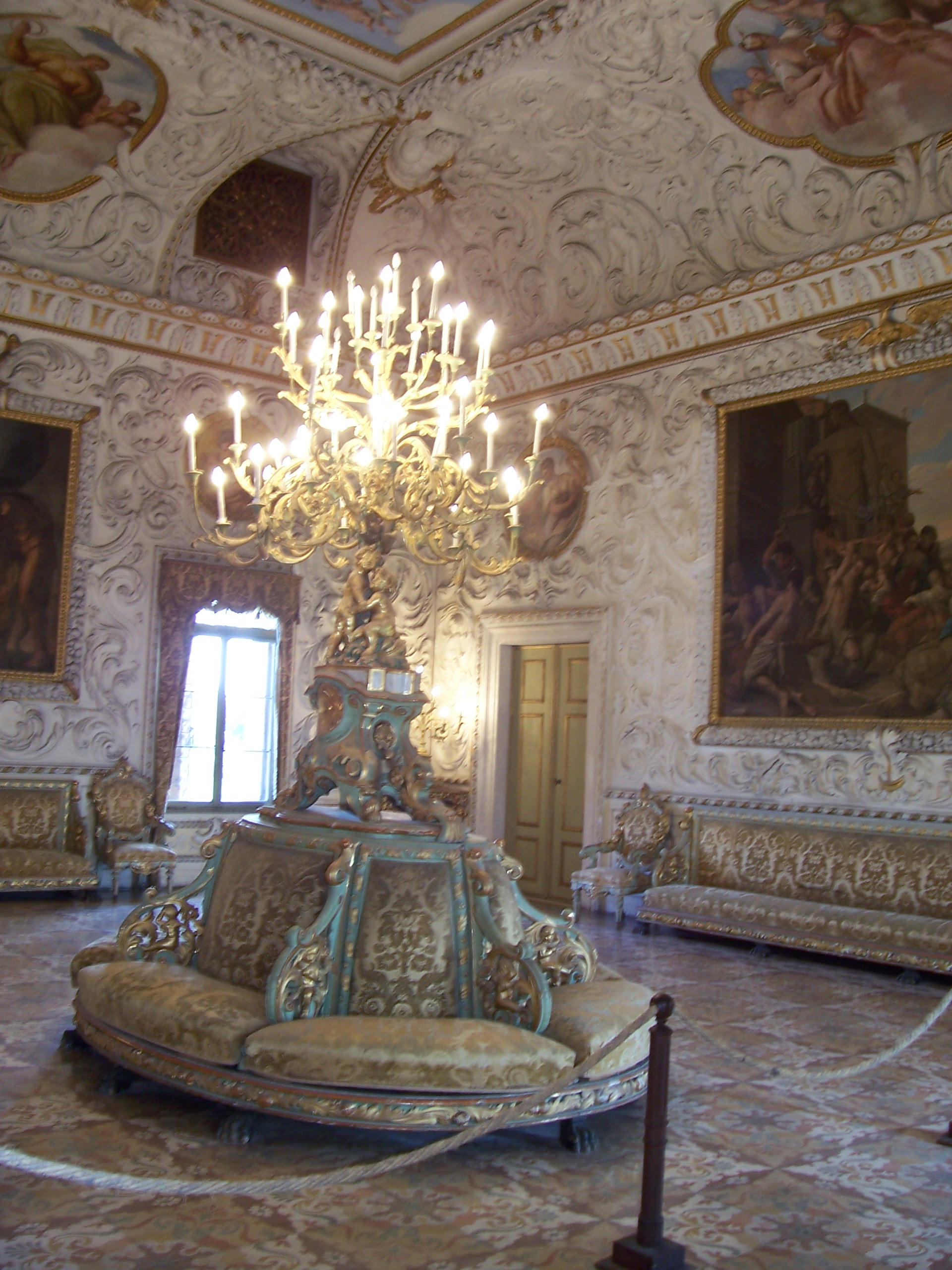
Interiors

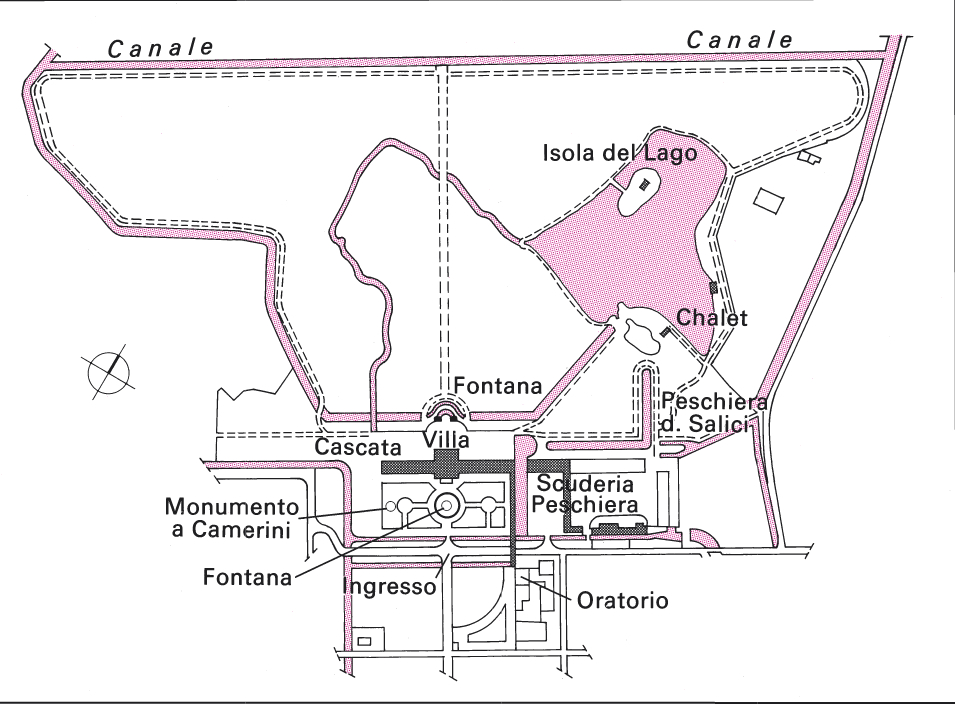
Plan of the complex

== See also ==
- Palladian architecture
- Palladian villas of the Veneto
