= Giovanni Antonio Scalfarotto =

Italian architect

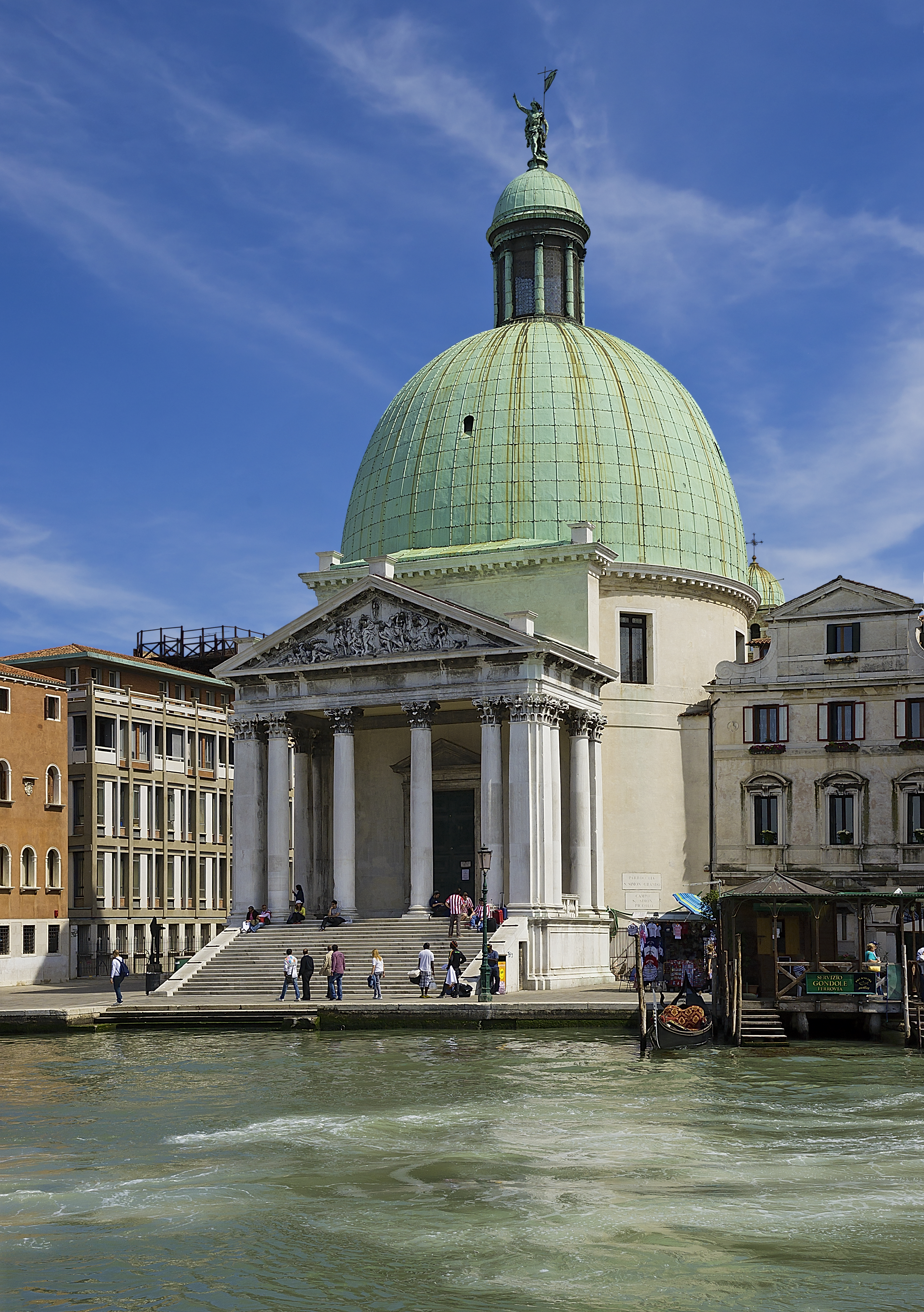
San Simeone Piccolo

Giovanni Antonio Scalfarotto (1672 – 1764) was an Italian architect from Venice.

He is said to have taught architectural drawing to the engraver Giovanni Piranesi. Like many eclectic architects of his time, it is difficult to pin down a specific style. He was likely limited in part because of the weight of architectural tradition in many of his projects. For example, his designs for the façade of the chiesa of San Rocco, completed posthumously, looked peculiarly antique, but are meant to match the adjacent Scuola di San Rocco. He designed the present bell tower for the church of San Salvador and San Bartolomeo (1747-1752) near the Rialto. He is best known for the designs of the church of San Simeone Piccolo across the Grand Canal from the modern railroad station. His nephew, Tommaso Temanza was also an architect in Venice.
