= San Simeone Piccolo =

Church in Venice, Italy

Coordinates: 45.4402°N 12.3224°E

Church of San Simeone Piccolo
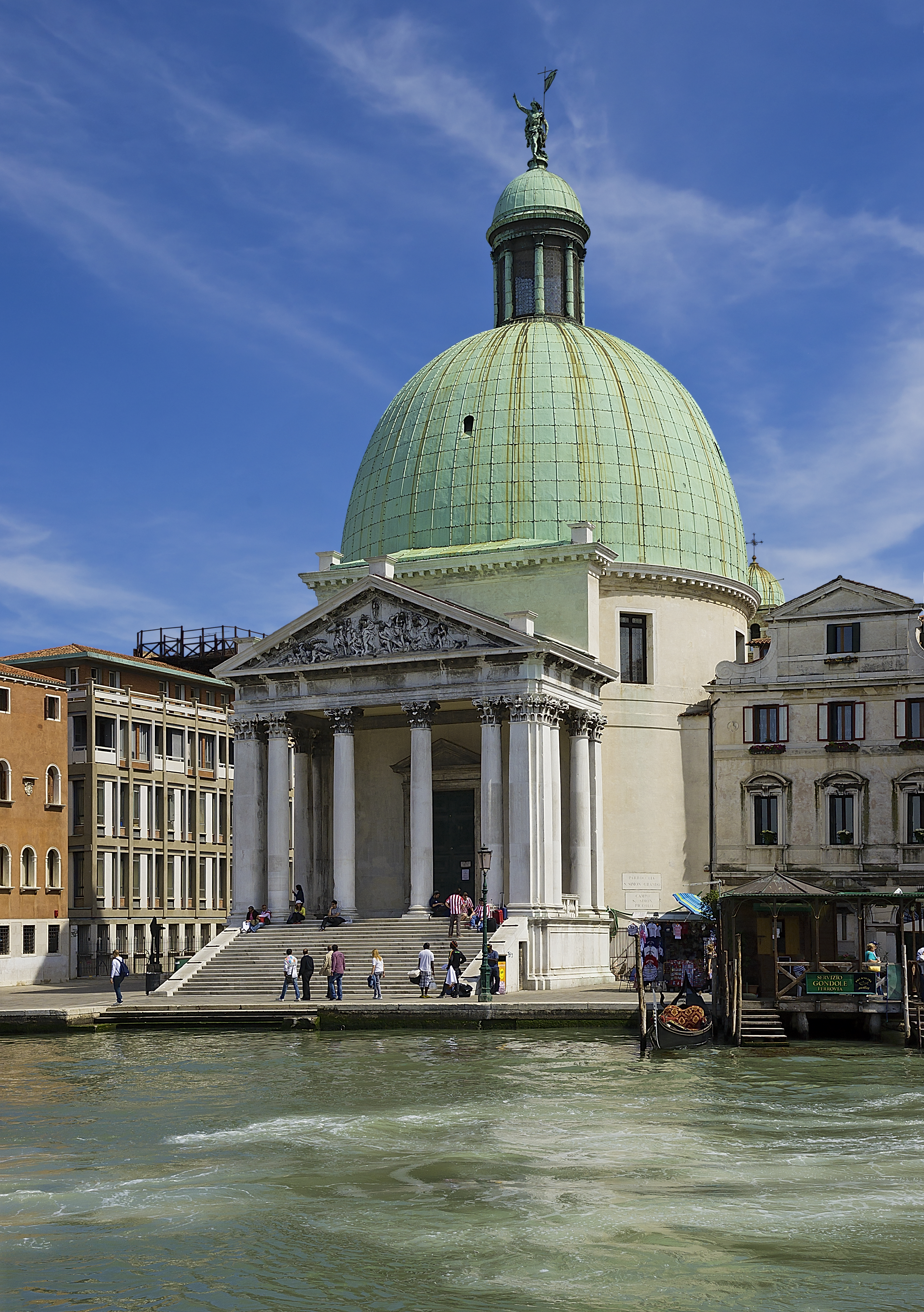
- Church of San Simeone Piccolo

- Location within Venice Location within Italy

Religion
- Affiliation: Roman Catholic
- Province: Venice

Location
- Location: Venice, Italy

Architecture
- Architect: Giovanni Antonio Scalfarotto
- Type: Church
- Style: Neoclassic
- Completed: 1738

San Simeone Piccolo (also called San Simeone e Giuda) is a church in the sestiere of Santa Croce in Venice, northern Italy. From across the Grand Canal it faces the railroad terminal serving as entrypoint for most visitors to the city.

== History ==
Built in 1718–38 by Giovanni Antonio Scalfarotto, the church shows the emerging eclecticism of Neoclassical architecture. It accumulates academic architectural quotations, much like the contemporaneous Karlskirche in Vienna. Wittkower, in his monograph, acknowledges San Simeone is modeled on the Pantheon with a temple-front pronaos, on the other hand, the peaked dome recalls Longhena's more embellished and prominent Santa Maria della Salute church. The centralized circular church design and the metal dome recalls Byzantine models and San Marco, though the numerous centrifugal chapels are characteristic of Post-Tridentine churches.

This was one of the last churches built in Venice, in one of its poorer sestieri.

The pediment of the entrance has a marble relief depicting "The Martyrdom of the Saints" by Francesco Penso, known as "il Cabianca." Saint Simon was apparently the martyred cousin of Christ, martyred as a Jew by the Romans.

The mass is celebrated according to the 1962 Roman Missal by the Priestly Fraternity of St. Peter.

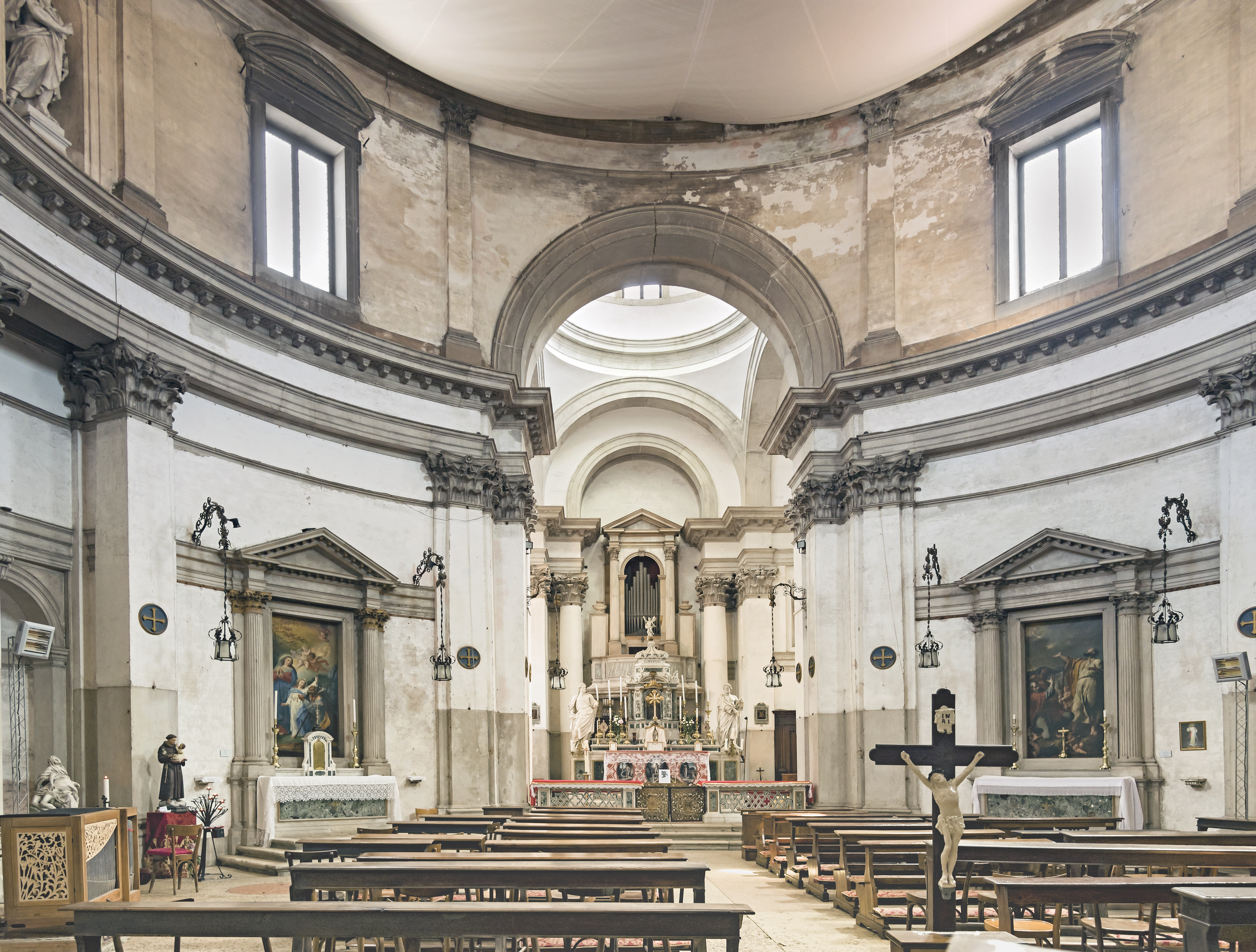
View of the interior of the church.

== Design and architecture ==
The church is neoclassical, with an oval cup dome, specially designed with the intent of making the church seem larger than it actually is. It also goes slightly underground, where there lies some religious depictions and paintings. Around the interior of San Simeone Piccolo there are several altar rooms, notorious for minor operas. On these altars some other artworks by Antonio Marinetti, Francesco Polazzo, and others.
