= Cambrai =

Cambrai Kimbré (Picard) Kamerijk (West Flemish)
- Subprefecture and commune
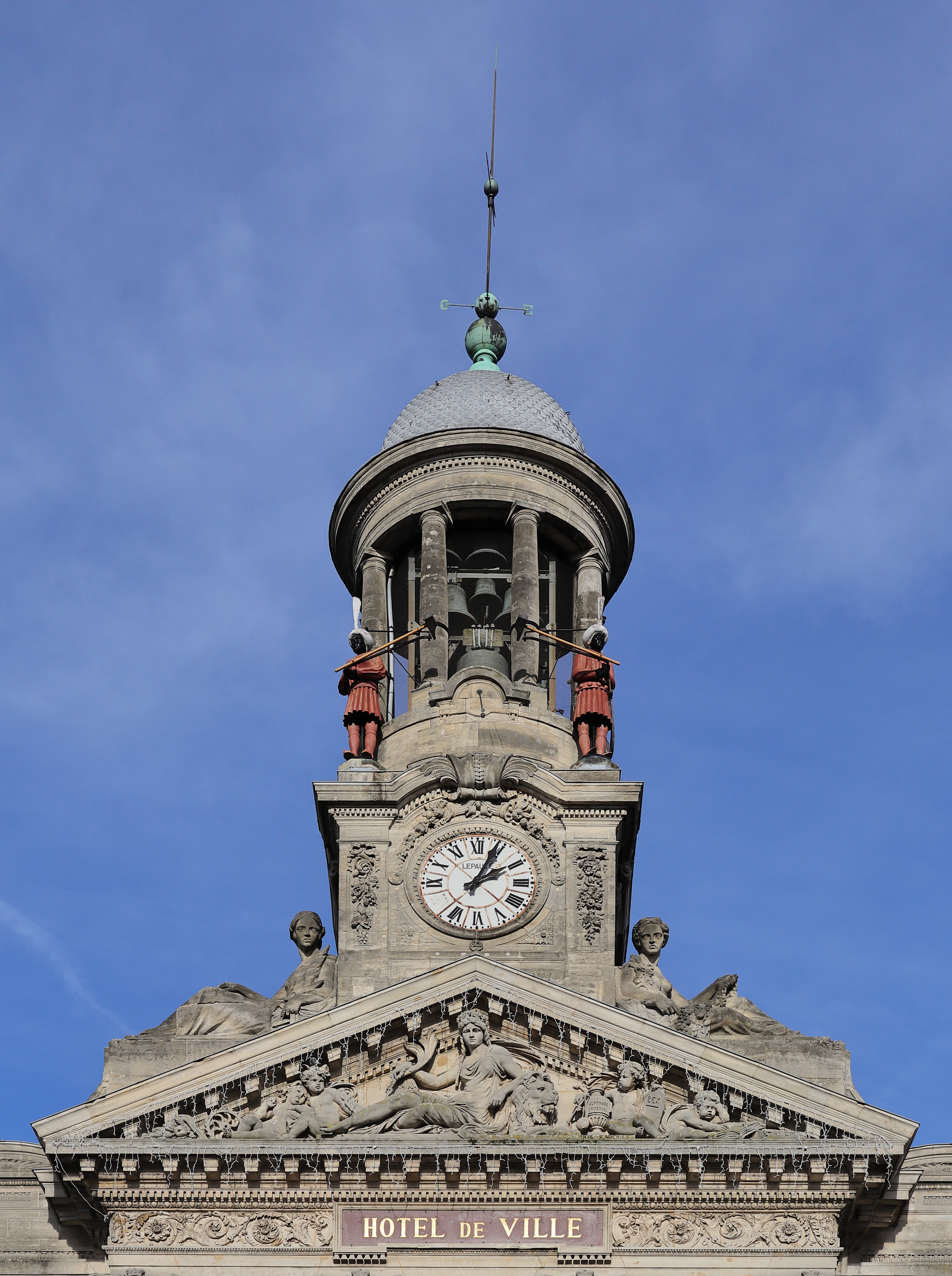
- The bell tower of the Hôtel de Ville (town hall), where Martin and Martine mark the hours

- Flag Coat of arms
- Location of Cambrai
- Location within France Location within Hauts-de-France
- Coordinates: 50°10′36″N 3°14′08″E
- Country: France
- Region: Hauts-de-France
- Department: Nord
- Arrondissement: Cambrai
- Canton: Cambrai
- Intercommunality: CA de Cambrai

Government
  - Mayor (2020–2026): Vacant
- Area^{1}: 18.12 km^{2} (7.00 sq mi)
- Elevation: 60 m (200 ft)
- Highest elevation: 101 m (331 ft)
- Lowest elevation: 41 m (135 ft)
- Population (2023): 31,134
  - Density: 1,718/km^{2} (4,450/sq mi)
- Demonym: Cambrésiens
- Time zone: UTC+01:00 (CET)
  - Summer (DST): UTC+02:00 (CEST)
- INSEE/Postal code: 59122 /59400
- ^{1} French Land Register data, which excludes lakes, ponds, glaciers > 1 km^{2} (0.386 sq mi or 247 acres) and river estuaries.

Cambrai (US: /kæmˈbreɪ, kɒ̃ˈ-/, French: [kɑ̃bʁɛ]; Picard: Kimbré; Dutch: Kamerijk), formerly Cambray and historically in English Camerick or Camericke, is a city in the Nord department and in the Hauts-de-France region of France on the Scheldt river, which is known locally as the Escaut river.

A sub-prefecture of the department, Cambrai is a town with about 31,000 inhabitants. It is in the heart of the urban unit of Cambrai with 46,000 inhabitants, and a functional area with 93,000 inhabitants. With Lille and the towns of the former Nord-Pas de Calais Mining Basin, it is also part of the Metropolitan area of Lille which has more than 3.8 million inhabitants.

Towards the end of the Roman Empire, Cambrai replaced Bavay as the "capital" of the land of the Nervii. At the beginning of the Merovingian era, Cambrai became the seat of an immense archdiocese covering all the right bank of the Scheldt and the centre of a small ecclesiastical principality, roughly coinciding with the shire of Brabant, including the central part of the Low Countries. The bishopric had some limited secular power and depended on the Holy Roman Empire until annexation to France in 1678. Fénelon, nicknamed the "Swan of Cambrai", was the most renowned of the archbishops.

The fertile lands which surround it and the textile industry gave it prosperity in the Middle Ages, but in modern times it is less industrialised than its neighbours of Nord-Pas-de-Calais.

Cambrai was the Duke of Wellington's headquarters, for the British Army of Occupation, from 1815 to 1818. Occupied by the German army during World War I, Cambrai suffered partial destruction in the First Battle of Cambrai from British artillery attacks on the town, including the nearby Bourlon Wood. The fighting around Cambrai, known as the Battle of Cambrai (20 November 1917 – 3 December 1917) is notable in that it is considered to be the first mass use of tanks in battle. A second Battle of Cambrai took place between 8 and 10 October 1918 as part of the Hundred Days Offensive. World War II was followed by reconstructions and a rapidly developing economy and population, abruptly reversed by the 1973 oil crisis.

Cambrai today is a lively city and, despite the past destruction, maintains a rich monumental heritage. Cambrai is affirmed as the urban centre of Cambrésis. Its economic life is strengthened by its position on the main local highway and river.

== History ==
=== Antiquity ===
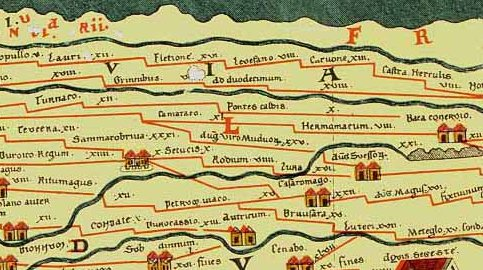
An extract from the Peutinger table showing Camaraco (Cambrai) northeast of Sammarobriva (present-day Amiens)

Little is known with certainty of the beginnings of Cambrai. Camaracum or Camaraco, as it was known to the Romans, is mentioned for the first time on the Peutinger table in the middle of the 4th century. It became the main town of the Roman province of the Nervii, whose first Roman capital had been at Bagacum, present-day Bavay.

In the middle of the 4th-century, Frankish raids from the north threatened Bavay and led the Romans to build forts along the Cologne to Bavay to Cambrai road, and thence to Boulogne. Cambrai thus occupied an important strategic position.

In 430, the Salian Franks under the command of Clodio the Long-Haired took the town. In 509, Clovis undertook to unify the Frankish kingdoms by getting rid of his relatives.

=== Middle Ages ===
Cambrai began to grow from a rural market into a real city during the Merovingian times, a long period of peace when the bishoprics of Arras and Cambrai were first unified, probably owing to the small number of clerics left at the time, and were later transferred to Cambrai, an administrative centre for the region. Successive bishops, including Gaugericus (in French Géry), founded abbeys and churches to host relics, which contributed powerfully to giving Cambrai both the appearance and functions of a city.

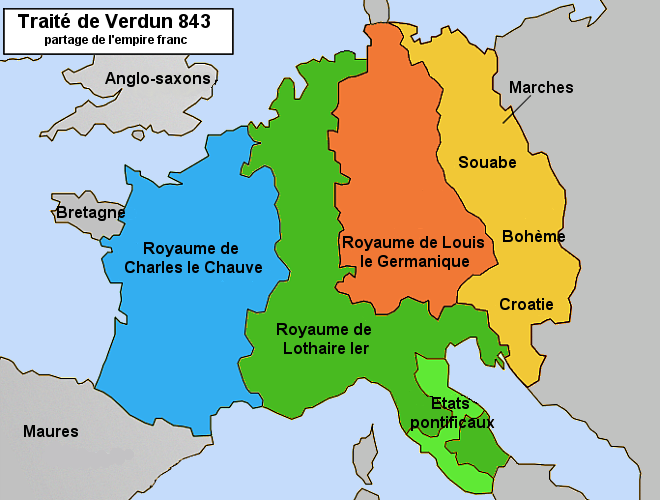
Following the Treaty of Verdun, Cambrai found itself as a median border city of the kingdom of Lothair I with the western lands of Charles the Bald

When the Treaty of Verdun in 843 split Charlemagne's empire into three parts, the county of Cambrai fell into Lothaire's kingdom. Upon the death of Lothair II, who had no heir, king Charles the Bald tried to gain control of his kingdom by having himself consecrated at Metz. Cambrai thus reverted, but only briefly, to the Western Frankish Realm. In 870 the town was destroyed by the Normans.

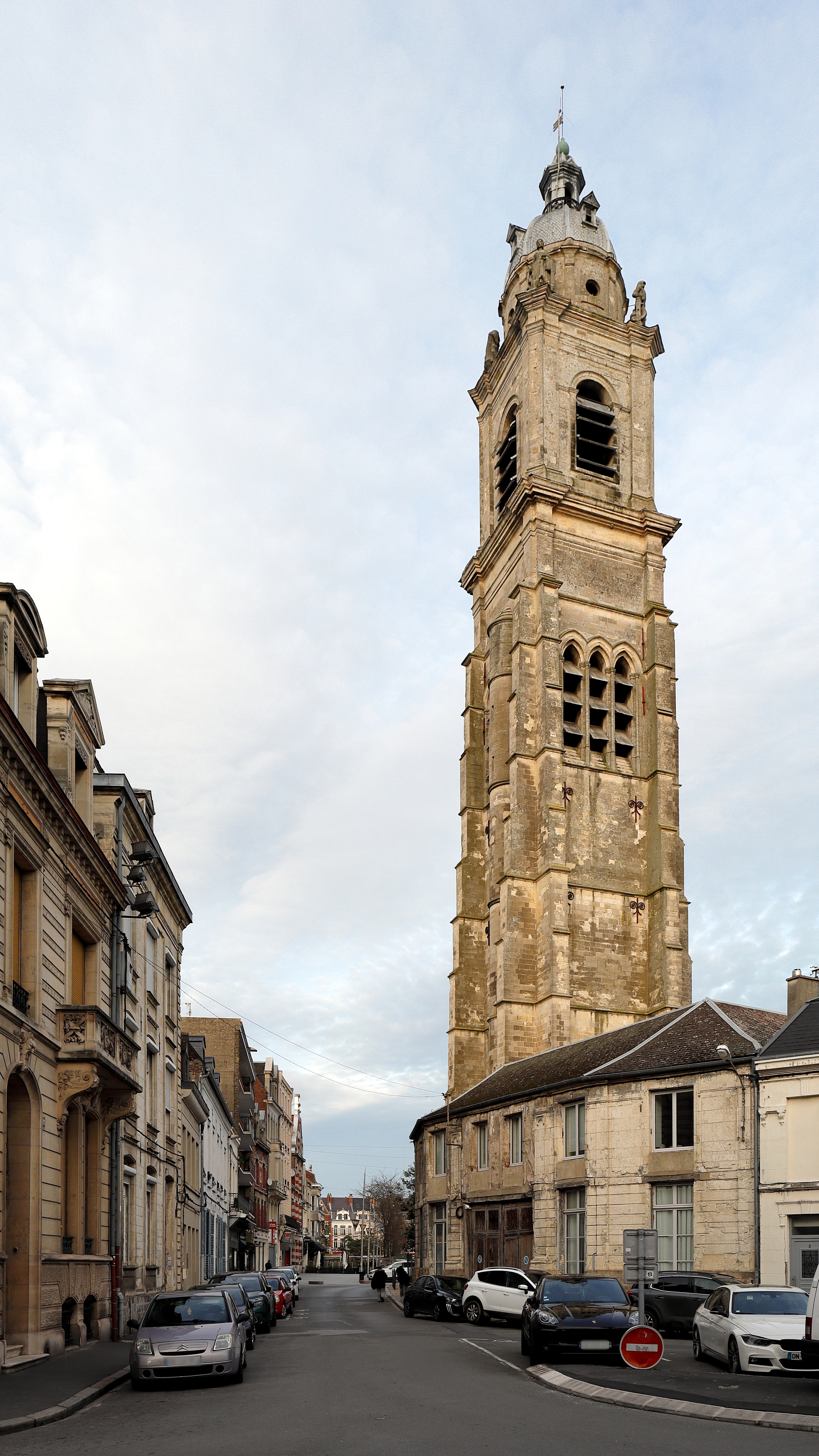
The belfry of Cambrai, the old bell tower of the Church of Saint Martin, symbol of communal freedoms

In the Middle Ages the region around Cambrai, called Cambrésis, was a county. Rivalries between the count, who ruled the city and county, and the bishop, ceased when in 948 Otto I granted the bishop with temporal powers over the city. In 1007, Emperor Henry II extended the bishop's temporal power to the territory surrounding Cambrai. The bishops then had both spiritual and temporal powers. This made Cambrai and Cambrésis a church principality, much like Liège, an independent state which was part of the Holy Roman Empire. The spiritual power of the bishop was exercised over a vast diocese, which stretched on the right bank of the Scheldt to Mons, Brussels and Antwerp. In 954, the Magyars under Bulcsú besieged Cambrai, which resisted all their attacks.

In 958 one of the first communal uprisings in Europe occurred in Cambrai. The inhabitants rebelled against Bishop Bérenger's power and abuses. The rebellion was severely repressed, but the discontent flared up again in the 10th and 11th centuries. Between 1077 and 1215, the burghers had a charter franchise on at least four occasions. Each time, these were eventually withdrawn by the combined efforts of the bishops and emperors. In 1227, following another period of unrest, the burghers of Cambrai had to give up their charters and accept the bishop's authority. The Loi Godefroid promulgated by the bishop, in fact or in law, left the people a number of freedoms won in the management of communal affairs.

Cambrai is also known for its Irish homily.

==== Economic activity ====
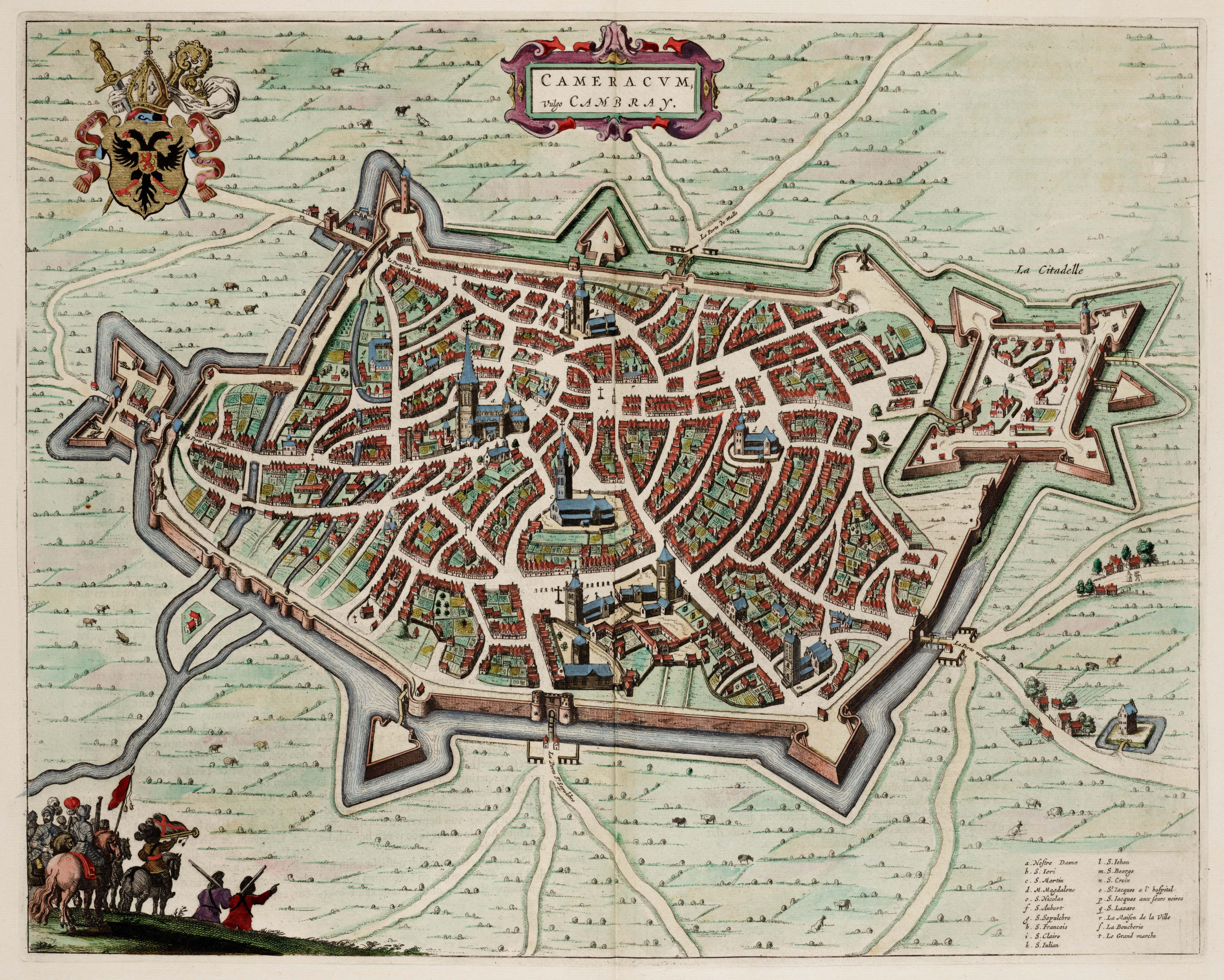
Plan of Cambrai drawn in 1649, depicting the outline of the 11th century walls

In the Middle Ages, the city grew richer and larger thanks to its weaving industry which produced woollen cloth, linen and cambric. Cambrai, and in particular the drapery, experienced an economic decline from the 15th century. Cambrai then belonged to a commercial hansa of seventeen low country cities whose aim was to develop trade with the fairs in Champagne and Paris. By the 11th century, the city walls had reached the circumference they would keep until the 19th century.

==== Music history ====
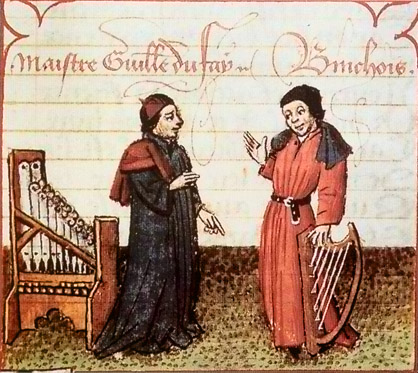
Dufay (left) in conversation with Gilles Binchois

Cambrai has a distinguished musical history, particularly in the 15th century. The cathedral there, a musical centre until the 17th century, had one of the most active musical establishments in the Low Countries; many composers of the Burgundian School either grew up and learned their craft there, or returned to teach. In 1428, Philippe de Luxembourg claimed that the cathedral was the finest in all of Christianity, for the fineness of its singing, its light, and the sweetness of its bells. Guillaume Dufay, the most famous European musician of the 15th century, studied at the cathedral from 1409 to 1412 under Nicolas Malin and Richard Loqueville, and returned in 1439 after spending many years in Italy. Cambrai cathedral had other famous composers in the later 15th century: Johannes Tinctoris and Ockeghem went to Cambrai to study with Dufay. Other composers included Nicolas Grenon, Alexander Agricola, and Jacob Obrecht. In the 16th century, Philippe de Monte, Johannes Lupi, and Jacobus de Kerle all worked there.

=== Early Modern era ===
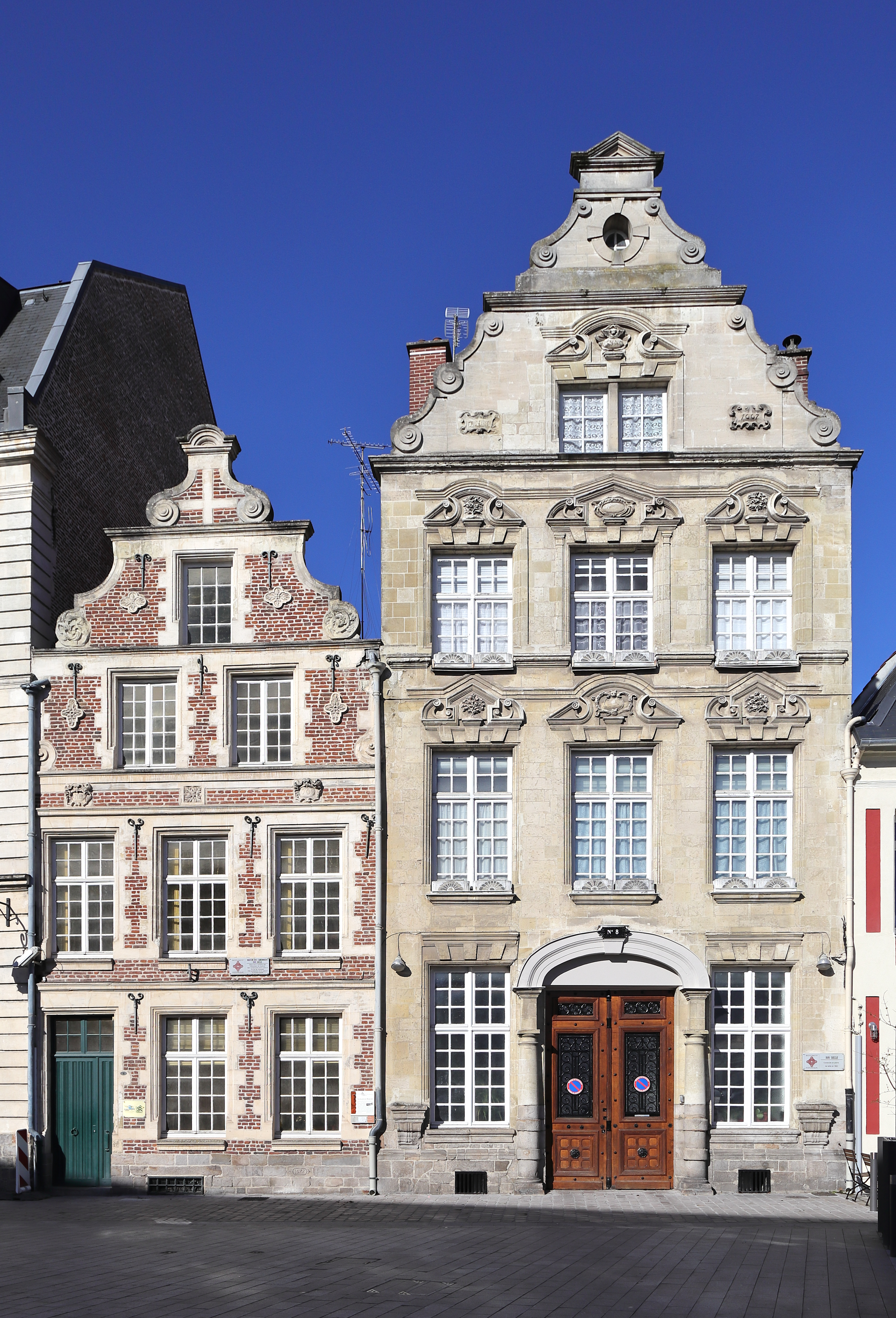
The "gunners' house" in Cambrai is an example of 17th-century Flemish architecture

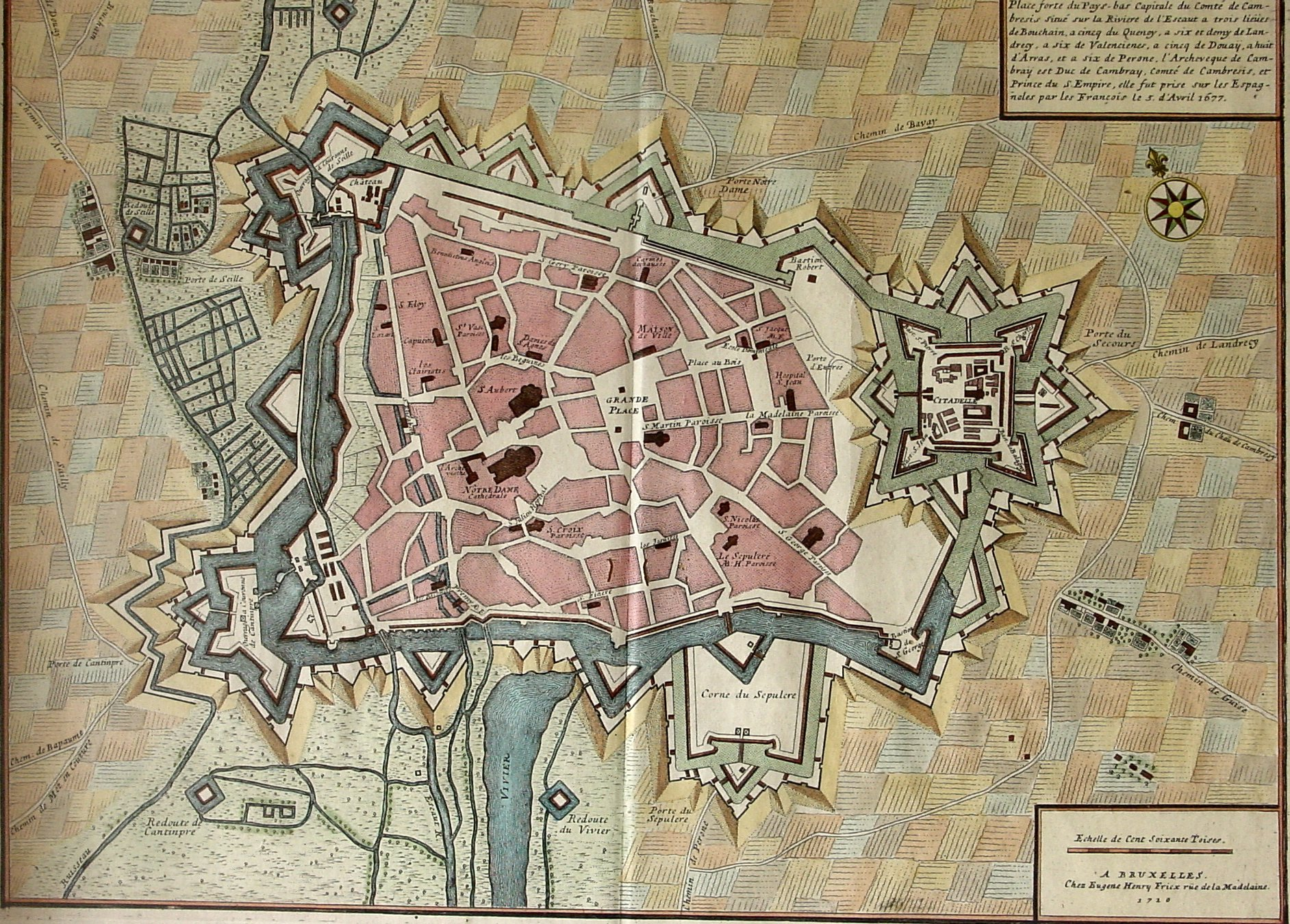
A map of Cambrai in 1710

As the economic centre of northern Europe moved away from Bruges, the area became poorer, with an associated period of cultural decline. Cambrai's neutrality and its position between the possessions of the Habsburg Empire and France made it the venue of several international negotiations, including the League of Cambrai, an alliance engineered in 1508 by Pope Julius II against the Republic of Venice, concluding in the Treaty of Cambrai.

In 1510, the alliance collapsed when the Pope allied with Venice against his former ally France. The conflict is also referred to as the War of the League of Cambrai and lasted from 1508 to 1516. Cambrai was also the site of negotiations in 1529, concluding in the Paix des Dames, which led to France's withdrawal from the War of the League of Cognac.

In 1595, Cambrai was taken by the Spanish in the eighth and last French Wars of Religion.

In December 1623, the community of nuns of the English Benedictine Congregation was founded at Cambrai. Expelled in 1793 as a result of the French Revolution, its successor community in 1838 was Stanbrook Abbey, near Malvern and later Wass in Yorkshire.

In 1630, Richelieu, wishing to counter the power of the Emperor and Spain, renewed the alliance of France with the United Provinces. The main effort of France had to focus on the Spanish Netherlands, and a sharing plan was established with the Dutch, with France to receive the Hainaut, Cambrésis, Artois, a large part of Flanders and Luxembourg and the County of Namur. War was declared against Spain in 1635: It was followed by a long series of wars which, compounded by subsistence and epidemics, caused crises which would bruise the Cambrésis. (Note: pp.144–145)

Mazarin tried unsuccessfully, in 1649, to seize Cambrai, which was being besieged by Henri de Lorraine-Harcourt and the Vicomte de Turenne. A Spanish regiment, which came from Bouchain, succeeded in entering the city and the siege was lifted. In 1657, the Vicomte de Turenne captured Cambrai. Again 4,000 horsemen under the command of Condé, in the service of the Spain, manage to penetrate, and Turenne abandoned the city. (Note: pp.145–146)

In 1666, in the greatest secrecy, Louis XIV prepared new conquests by making plans of the Spanish fortifications, and then began the War of Devolution. The Treaty of Aix-la-Chapelle from 1668 allowed the Kingdom of France to obtain a large number of strongholds, but Cambrai was not a part of them, nor were Bouchain, Valenciennes or Condé-sur-l'Escaut.

==== The annexation by France ====
In 1672, hostilities resumed against the Protestant Republic of the Netherlands and continued in the following years. In 1676, Louis XIV, in an effort to "safeguard the tranquility of his borders for ever" ("assurer à jamais le repos de ses frontières"), focused most of his efforts against Spain and occupied Condé and Bouchain. On 17 March 1677, the French troops stormed Valenciennes and moved toward Cambrai, the strongest place of the Netherlands, (Note: p.147) which was reached on 20 March. On 22 March, Louis XIV was in the city in person. (Note: p.149)

On 2 April, the French invested in a part of the place. By 5 April, Cambrai surrendered, given the same benefits as Lille in 1667, (Note: p.150) but the Spanish garrison took refuge in the citadel and the siege continued until 17 April. After 29 days of siege the king made his entry into the city, on 19 April, Easter Monday. (Note: p.151) Louis XIV named the Marquis de Cesen as governor, and appointed 14 new aldermen while keeping the same provost. The Hôtel de Ville (town hall), in its current style, dates from 1786.

=== The French Revolution ===
Cambrai suffered from the Revolution: Joseph Le Bon, sent by the Comité de salut public, arrived in Cambrai in 1794. He was to set up an era of "terror", sending many to the guillotine, until he was tried and executed in 1795. One of his most famous victims was François III Maximilien de la Woestyne, 3rd Marquess of Becelaere.

Most of the religious buildings of Cambrai were demolished in that period: in 1797, the old cathedral, which had been dubbed the "wonder of the low countries", was sold to a merchant on 6 June 1796 who left only the tower, (Note: p.410) after exploiting the cathedral as a stone quarry. The main tower was left standing until 1809, when it collapsed (Note: p.424) in a storm. The cathedral's archives have been preserved, they are now at the Archives Départementales du Nord in Lille, and a new cathedral was later provided.

=== 19th century ===
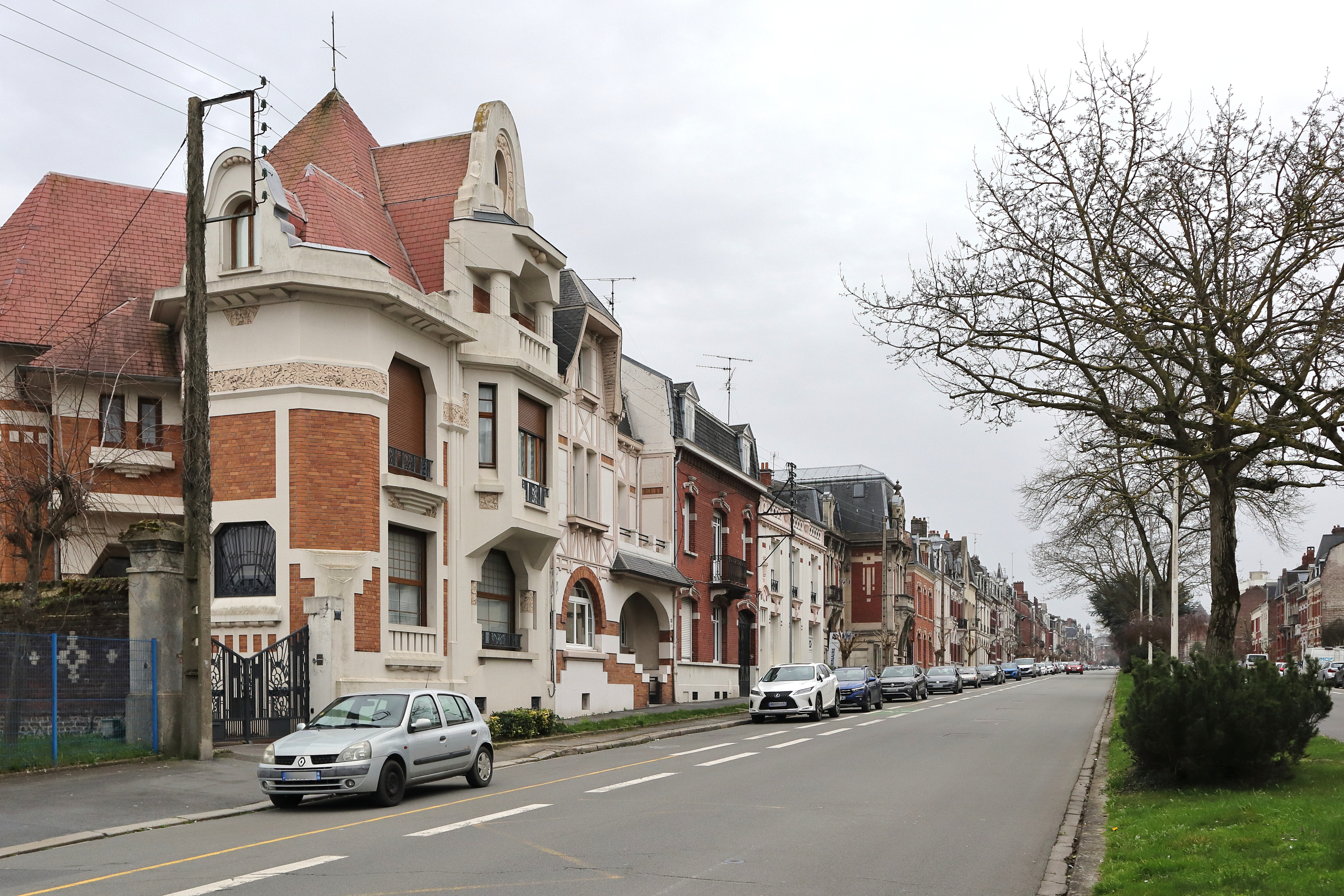
The Boulevard Faidherbe, built in 1898 on the site of the ramparts

The Franco-Prussian War of 1870 widely spared Cambrai. It also showed the futility of the fortifications, which the city obtained permission to demolish, at its expense, in 1892. (Note: p. 238) The outer boulevards were constructed on the location of the walls, between 1894 and the beginning of the 20th century. The appearance of the city was radically transformed, and the works stimulated the city's economy. (Note: p. 245)

=== 20th century ===
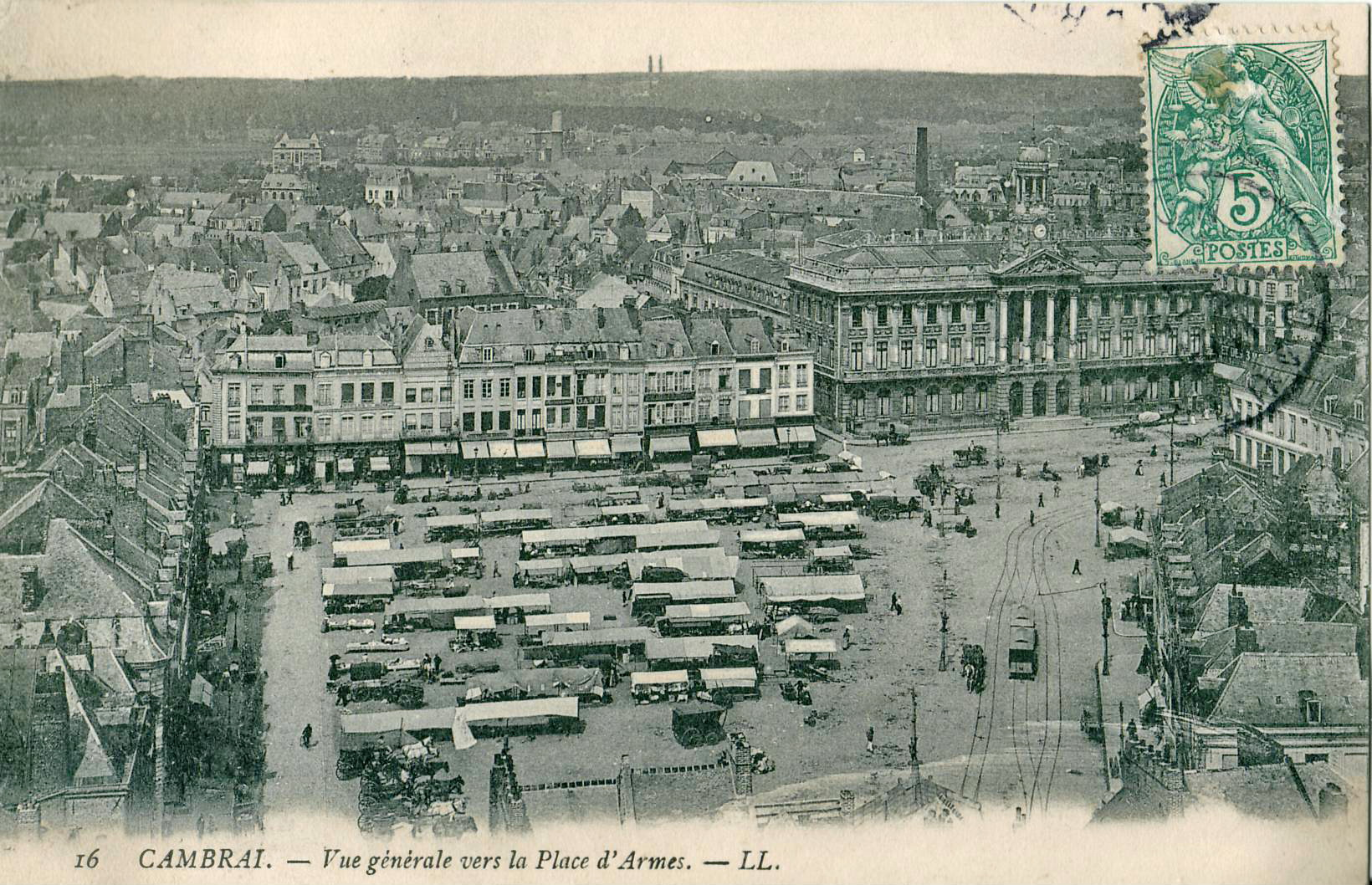
The Place d'Armes, on a market day before the First World War

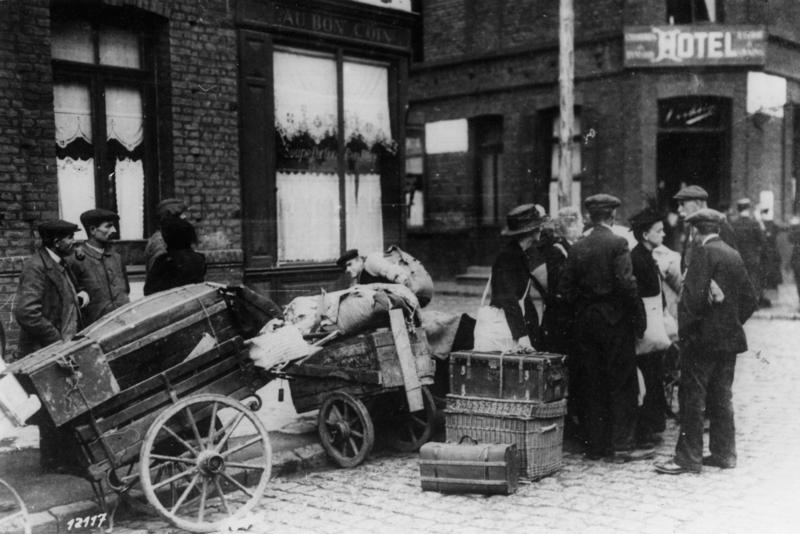
Refugees at Cambrai in September 1918

In 1914, the German army occupied the city. This occupation, which lasted for four years, was marked by scenes of looting, requisitions and arrests of hostages. From 20 November to 17 December 1917, the vicinity of the town of Cambrai was the theatre of the Battle of Cambrai, which saw the massed use of tanks for the first time.

In 1918, the Germans burned the city centre before leaving, destroying the city hall and the municipal archives. In total, more than 1,500 buildings were totally destroyed, of the 3,500 which consisted of Cambrai. The centre was to be rebuilt, a task which was entrusted to the architect Pierre Leprince-Ringuet. (Note: p.264) (Note: p.266)

World War II also struck Cambrai. The city was bombed by the Luftwaffe on 17 May 1940, during the Battle of France, before falling the next day at the same time as Saint-Quentin. The remains of the 9th French Army and General Giraud were taken prisoner by the Germans.

From 27 April until 18 August 1944, 18 Allied air raids were directed against the railway tracks, killing 250 people and destroying 1,700 buildings, (Note: p.275) or more than 50% of the city. The first American tanks entered the city on 2 September.

After the war, the priority again was reconstruction. A municipality of the "union of the left" was elected in 1945, led by Raymond Gernez who would remain at the head of the city until 1981, promoting moderate socialism. (Note: p.285) As early as 1947, the city submitted to a development project of the Ministry of Reconstruction. The municipality gave priority to the construction of houses: The Maison du Cambrésis [House of le Cambrésis], later Maison Familiale group, an HLM cooperative society, contributed substantially to the reconstruction of the city. (Note: p.279) The population of the city increased, while the surrounding area tended to be depopulated. At the same time, the city lost industrial jobs and moved towards the tertiary sector, but it was public administrations which provided the bulk of jobs. (Note: p.280-284)

== Geography ==
=== Location ===
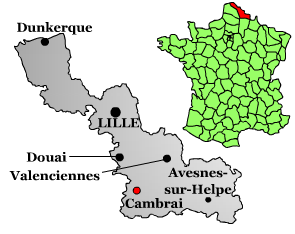
The location of Cambrai in the Nord department

The town of Cambrai is in the southern part of the Nord Department, of which it is chef-lieu of the arrondissement. It belongs to the dense network of the cities of the area which are separated by a few tens of kilometres: Douai is 24 kilometres (15 mi) away, Valenciennes is 29 kilometres (18 mi), Arras is 35 kilometres (22 mi) and Saint-Quentin 37 kilometres (23 mi), all measured as the crow flies. The regional capital, Lille, is 52 kilometres (32 mi) from Cambrai.

Cambrai is not very far from several European capitals: Brussels is 108 kilometres (67 mi) away, Paris is 160 kilometres (99 mi) and London is 279 kilometres (173 mi).

Cambrai was born and developed on the right bank of the Scheldt river, locally known as the Escaut. The river has its source in the department of Aisne, just a little over 20 kilometres (12 mi) away.

=== Geology and landforms ===
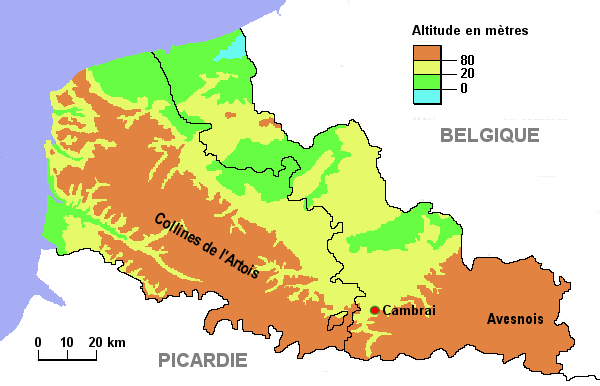
Cambrai in its topographical context

Cambrai is located on chalk bedrock of the Cretaceous period, which forms the northern boundary of the Paris Basin, between, to the east, the hills for Thiérache and Avesnois, the foothills of the Ardennes, and northwest, the hills of Artois. It is at a point which is relatively lower than these two regions, called the "Cambrai threshold" or the "Bapaume threshold", which facilitates the passage between the south and the north.

Bapaume (Artois) is 100 metres (330 ft) above sea level, Avesnes-sur-Helpe (Avesnois) is at 143 metres (469 ft) and Cambrai only 41 metres (135 ft). The Saint-Quentin canal, the Canal du Nord, the A1, A2 and A26 autoroutes all borrow all this passage between the basin of the Seine and the plains of the Nord department.

The chalky subsoil allowed the digging of a network of cellars, tunnels and quarries under the city. The poor quality of the Cambrai chalk was reserved for use in the manufacture of lime or filling, and common constructions. For prestigious buildings, stone from the nearby villages of Noyelles-sur-Escaut, Rumilly or Marcoing was used.

Cambrai is bordered in its western part, and to the north and the south, by the alluvial zones of the Scheldt Valley.

=== Hydrography ===
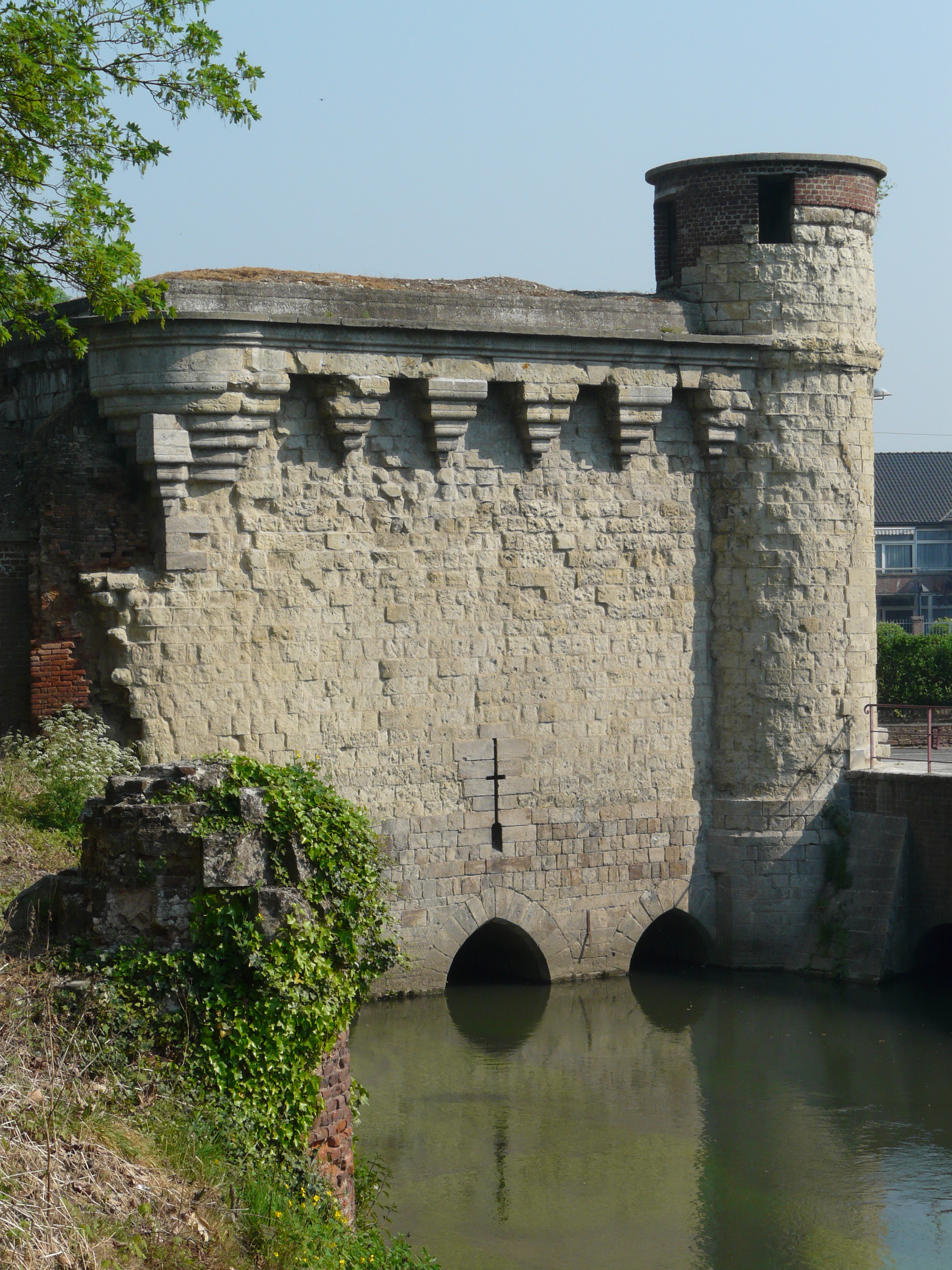
The Tower of Arquets (14th century) controlled the entry of the Scheldt in the city and the flood defences.

Cambrai is built on the right bank of the Scheldt. The river, still of a very modest flow in Cambrai, played a crucial role in the history of the city by providing multiple functions, including allowed the transportation of men and goods since antiquity. It was undeveloped and was crossed by numerous marshes. It was with the discovery of coal at Anzin in 1734 that the Scheldt was expanded and declared navigable in 1780, from Cambrai to the North Sea. The Scheldt is today the Canal de l'Escaut downstream of Cambrai.

The river initially served as the boundary between the bishoprics of Tournai on its left bank and Cambrai on its right bank, from the 6th century. When the division of Charlemagne's Empire in 843, this border was retained to delimit the kingdoms of Lothair I and Charles the Bald, making Cambrai a city of the Holy Roman Empire until 1677.

The Scheldt was indispensable to many economic activities, such as the tanning, milling, the manufacture of salt and soap, and for retting of linen, the weaving of which was one of the main activities of the city.

The river was used in the Middle Ages and then by Vauban, for the defence of the city by the establishment of flood defensive areas.

Despite its important role in the history of the city, the Scheldt is little integrated into the present urban landscape.

=== Climate ===
Main article: Climate of Nord-Pas-de-Calais

Climate in this area has mild differences between highs and lows, and there is adequate rainfall year round. The Köppen Climate Classification subtype for this climate is "Cfb" (Marine West Coast Climate/Oceanic climate). However, the city is about 110 kilometres (68 mi) from the nearest coast. (Note: Dunkirk is 113 kilometres (70 mi), Berck is 121 kilometres (75 mi).)

Precipitation is distributed year-round, with highs in the spring and autumn, with February being the driest month. Contrasting with the rainy image of the region, the total annual precipitation is relatively small with 642 millimetres (25.3 in) at Cambrai-Épinoy; identical to the Montsouris Paris station, which is at the same altitude, it is less than those of Toulouse at 656 millimetres (25.8 in) or Nice at 767 millimetres (30.2 in). However, the number of days of rain (63 in Nice, 120 in Cambrai) confirms the oceanic character of the climate.

The mean thermal amplitude between the winter and summer does not exceed 15 °C. Although again establishing a comparison with Paris, that Cambrai is 1.5 to 2 °C colder over all combined seasons. On average, there are 71 days of fog per year (Paris-Montsouris has 13) 15 days of storm (Paris-Montsouris has 19) and 20 days with snow (Paris-Montsouris has 15).

If comparing the data of Cambrai and those of towns such as Dunkirk or Boulogne, there are colder minimum temperatures and a warmer maximum in Cambrai, the difference being approximately 2 °C, and a larger number of freezing days and less heavy precipitation. It's described a "transitional" oceanic climate, with some continental influences.

The temperature record in Cambrai is 38.2 °C (100.8 °F), which was established on 6 August 2003 (data collected since 1954 and record updated to 5 September 2013).

Climate data for Cambrai (1991–2020 normals, extremes 1954–present)
Month	Jan	Feb	Mar	Apr	May	Jun	Jul	Aug	Sep	Oct	Nov	Dec	Year
Record high °C (°F)	14.9 (58.8)	18.6 (65.5)	23.3 (73.9)	27.6 (81.7)	30.9 (87.6)	34.7 (94.5)	41.8 (107.2)	38.2 (100.8)	34.7 (94.5)	28.6 (83.5)	19.5 (67.1)	16.2 (61.2)	41.8 (107.2)
Mean daily maximum °C (°F)	6.2 (43.2)	7.3 (45.1)	11.1 (52.0)	15.0 (59.0)	18.4 (65.1)	21.4 (70.5)	23.8 (74.8)	23.8 (74.8)	20.3 (68.5)	15.3 (59.5)	10.0 (50.0)	6.7 (44.1)	14.9 (58.8)
Daily mean °C (°F)	3.8 (38.8)	4.4 (39.9)	7.2 (45.0)	10.1 (50.2)	13.5 (56.3)	16.4 (61.5)	18.6 (65.5)	18.6 (65.5)	15.5 (59.9)	11.6 (52.9)	7.2 (45.0)	4.4 (39.9)	10.9 (51.6)
Mean daily minimum °C (°F)	1.3 (34.3)	1.5 (34.7)	3.3 (37.9)	5.2 (41.4)	8.6 (47.5)	11.4 (52.5)	13.4 (56.1)	13.3 (55.9)	10.8 (51.4)	8.0 (46.4)	4.5 (40.1)	2.0 (35.6)	6.9 (44.4)
Record low °C (°F)	−19.8 (−3.6)	−17.2 (1.0)	−11.4 (11.5)	−4.5 (23.9)	−1.3 (29.7)	1.2 (34.2)	4.5 (40.1)	5.0 (41.0)	0.8 (33.4)	−5.4 (22.3)	−9.0 (15.8)	−12.8 (9.0)	−19.8 (−3.6)
Average precipitation mm (inches)	54.1 (2.13)	47.9 (1.89)	50.0 (1.97)	42.7 (1.68)	56.7 (2.23)	63.7 (2.51)	67.7 (2.67)	67.7 (2.67)	56.5 (2.22)	63.6 (2.50)	62.6 (2.46)	69.7 (2.74)	702.9 (27.67)
Average precipitation days (≥ 1.0 mm)	10.9	10.4	9.9	8.9	9.6	9.3	9.8	9.4	9.3	10.8	12.1	12.2	122.7
Source: Meteociel

Ombrothermic diagram

== Transport ==
=== Road ===
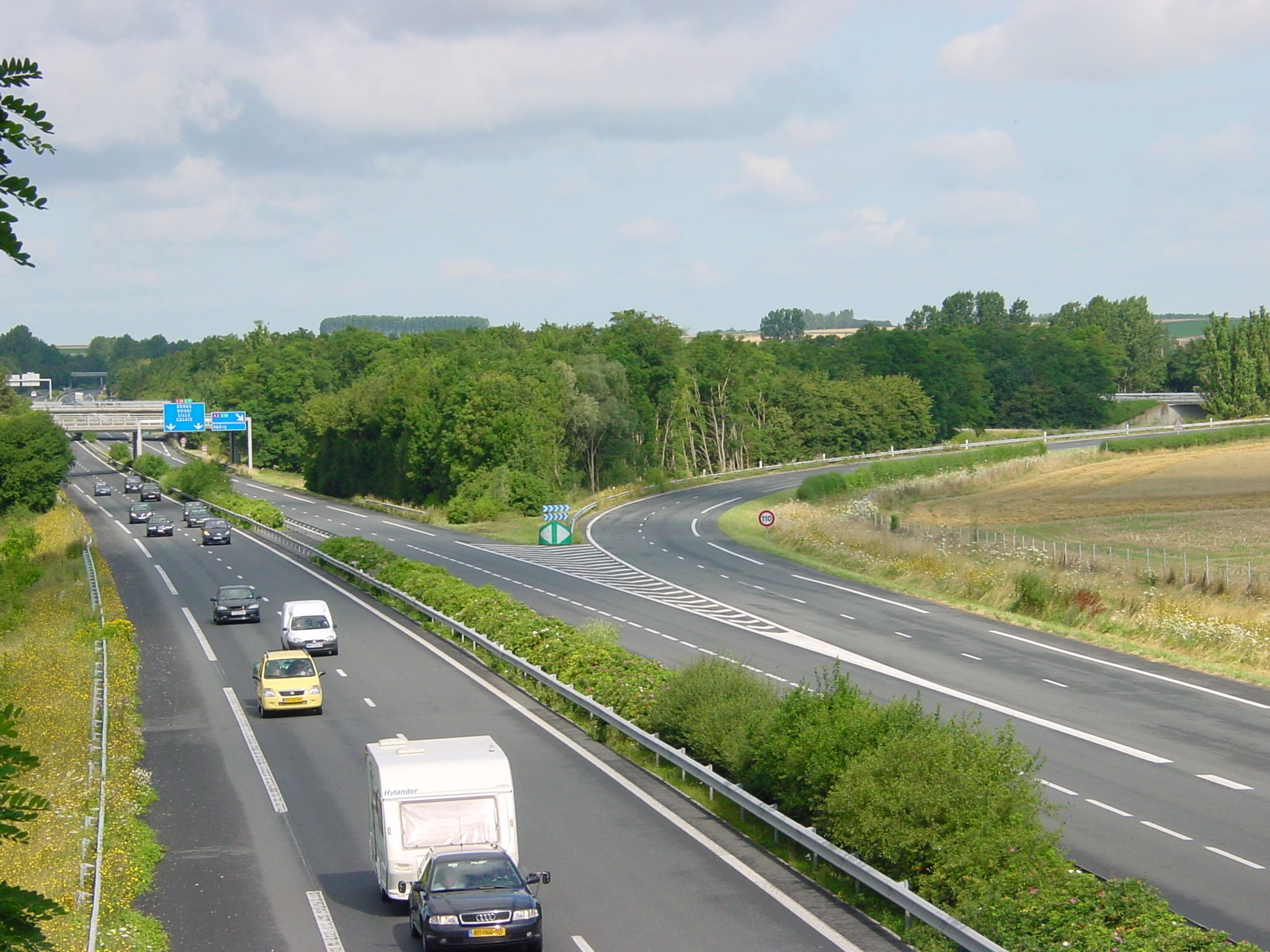
The A26 autoroute at its intersection with the A2, near Cambrai

Cambrai is located at the crossroads of two French autoroutes, the A2 from Combles (junction with the A1 coming from Paris) to the Franco-Belgian border, opened in 1973, and the A26 from Calais to Troyes, opened in 1992. These autoroutes partly merge with the European roads of the E19 from Amsterdam to Paris via Brussels, for the A2, and the E17 from Antwerp to Beaune via Lille and Reims, for the A26.

Cambrai and its region are served by four autoroute interchanges: The A2, exit 14 (Cambrai) from Paris and exit 15 (Bouchain) from Brussels, and on the A26 the exits 8 (Marquion) from Calais and 9 (Masnières) from Reims.

Cambrai is also at the crossroads of the Route nationale 30 of Bapaume to Quiévrain (Franco-Belgian border), Route nationale 43 of Sainte-Ruffine (Metz) to Calais, Route nationale 44 of Cambrai to Vitry (these last three have since 2006 been downgraded to departmental roads and therefore consequently renamed to D6xx), and D939 (former Route nationale 39) of Cambrai to Arras.

To facilitate access to the east of the Cambrésis from the A2 and A26 autoroutes, to alleviate traffic in the crossing of the city and to serve the future Niergnies business zone, a southern bypass was the subject of a declaration of public utility (DPU) on 22 April 1999. Its route has been repeatedly modified and challenged, because it crosses the urban ecological park of the Chenu Wood in Proville, the only public natural green space of the Cambrésis. The bypass is in service since 17 September 2010.

A bypass to the north is also part of the program of major departmental projects, which was required to have been initiated by 2011.

=== Railway ===
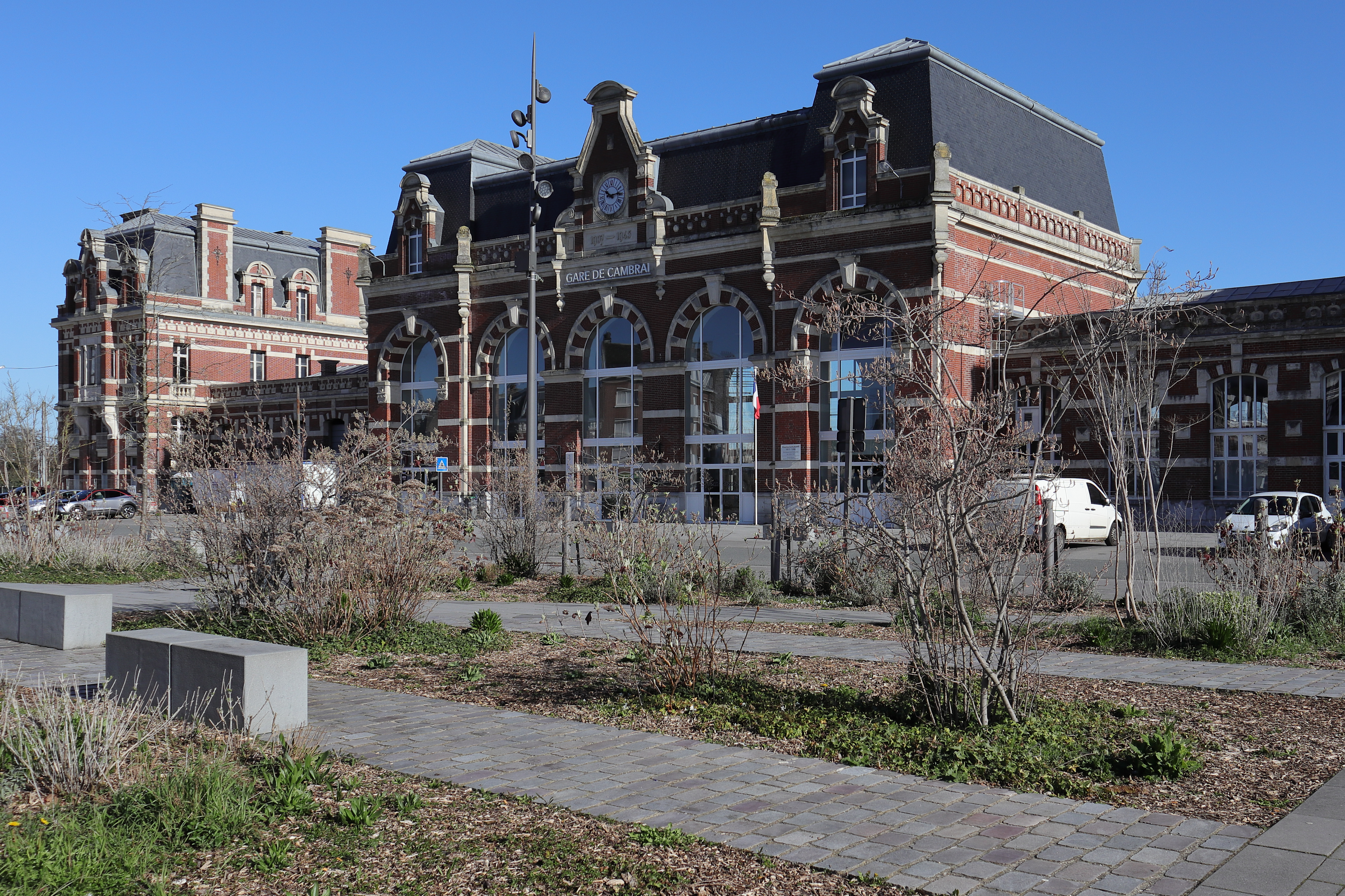
The SNCF railway station in Cambrai

Cambrai railway station is connected by direct trains (TER) to Lille, Douai, Valenciennes, Saint-Quentin, and Reims.

The link to Douai and Lille has improved after the electrification of the single-track Douai to Cambrai line in 1993, for the commissioning of joining Paris to Cambrai by TGV via Douai, which was subsequently cancelled. Direct connections on weekdays are fifteen trains per day, with a journey time of about 30 minutes between Douai and Cambrai; eight trains, with a journey time often less than an hour, to Lille-Flandres station; ten trains, with a time of little more than 40 minutes on average to Valenciennes and a dozen trains, with a journey time of around 50 minutes, to Saint-Quentin.

Links to Paris from Cambrai (Gare du Nord) are mediocre if compared to those of the neighbouring cities. Valenciennes, Douai and Arras are connected to Paris by TGV several times per day. Saint-Quentin is connected by TER or Intercités trains with less than two hours travel time. Cambrai was connected to Paris in 2010 by a single direct Intercités service of two hours, with a little-suited schedule for professional use. The times of other trains via Douai or Saint-Quentin vary between two and four and a half hours.

==== Railway history ====
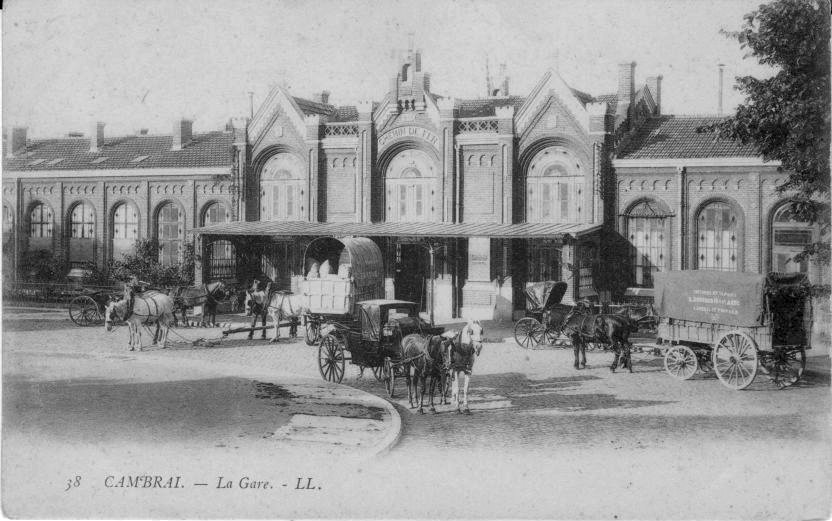
The Gare de Cambrai-Annexe in 1913

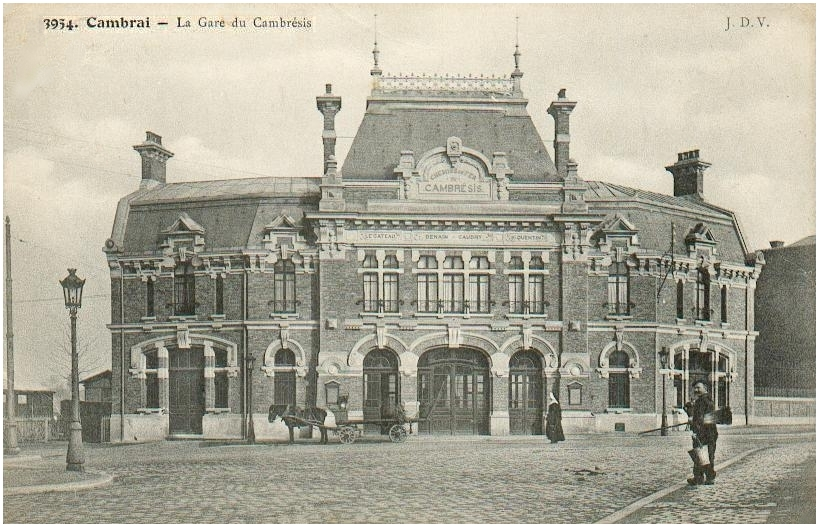
The Gare du Cambrésis, former head of the line of the Chemin de fer du Cambrésis

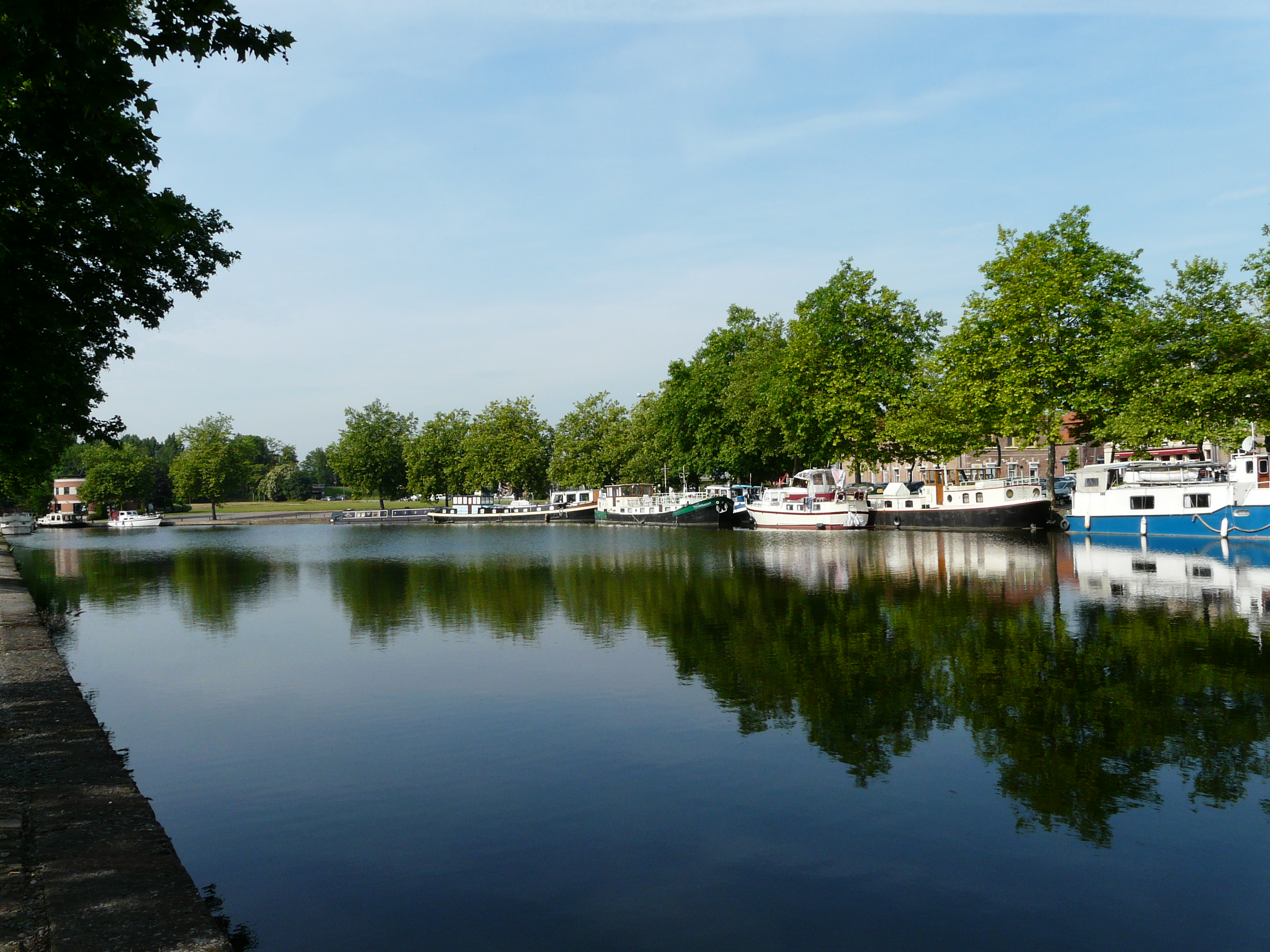
The marina of Cantimpré

As early as 1833, the municipal council sought passage of a railway line through Cambrai. However, a route through Arras and Douai, to Lille, with a branch to Valenciennes, was preferred in 1845. It remained, therefore, to connect Cambrai to this line, which was done in 1878 by a single, winding line between Cambrai and Douai. Meanwhile, Cambrai had been linked, in 1858, to the Paris-Brussels line by a branch line from Busigny and joining Somain, near Douai.

Other railway lines of local interest saw development in the 19th century, particularly in 1880 the Société des Chemin de fer du Cambrésis which operated three routes in the Cambrésis between Cambrai, Caudry, Saint-Quentin, Le Cateau and Denain. An agricultural use of Cambrai to Marquion, now off line, was also open in 1898.

Cambrai railway station was also the terminus of a standard gauge secondary route of CGL/VFIL linking Marquion and Boisleux-au-Mont.

==== Railway projects ====
The regional transport scheme evokes three axes or projects concerning Cambrai: Improving the Douai-Cambrai connections, the construction of a new railway line between Cambrai and Marquion-Arras, in conjunction with the large gauge Seine-North Europe canal project and the establishment of a business zone of Marquion, as well as "searching for a link from Orchies towards Cambrai".

=== Waterways ===
Cambrai is one of the seven territorial subdivisions of the regional management of Nord-Pas-de-Calais of navigable waterways in France. The city is located at the junction of the Saint-Quentin canal to the Oise and Paris and the Canal de l'Escaut, which leads to the Dunkerque-Escaut canal. A marina is located at the junction of the two canals, at Cambrai-Cantimpré.

==== Waterways history ====
The Canal de l'Escaut (Scheldt canal), between Cambrai and Valenciennes, was opened to navigation in 1780.

Moreover, a river link between Paris and the Nord department had been projected as early as the time of Mazarin and Colbert. The construction of the Saint-Quentin canal, between Chauny on the Oise and Cambrai, was taken up in 1802 on the order of Napoleon I and completed in 1810, after the drilling of the Riqueval Tunnel. The canal and tunnel were opened with great pomp on 28 April 1810 by the Emperor and Empress Marie-Louise. The Saint-Quentin canal has experienced heavy traffic, but since 1966, the date of the opening of the Canal du Nord, it has lost much of its importance.

==== Waterways projects ====
A wide-gauge river link project, called Seine-Escaut Link project is part of the 30 priority projects of the future trans-European transport network. The route of this project is through Marquion, 12 kilometres (7.5 mi) west of Cambrai. A platform of activities is planned therein. The commissioning of the canal could take place around 2015.

=== Airports ===
Cambrai is in close proximity to two airfields: Cambrai-Epinoy, to the north-west, whose use was booked at the Airbase 103 until its closure in 2012, and Cambrai Niergnies, 5 kilometres (3.1 mi) to the southeast, opened to recreational aviation.

Within an approximate radius of 1 hr 30 mins by road are five major airports: Lille-Lesquin at 60 kilometres (37 mi), Brussels South Charleroi at 114 kilometres (71 mi), Brussels National at 148 kilometres (92 mi), Paris Beauvais-Tillé at 151 kilometres (94 mi) and Paris Charles-de-Gaulle at 152 kilometres (94 mi).

=== Urban transport ===
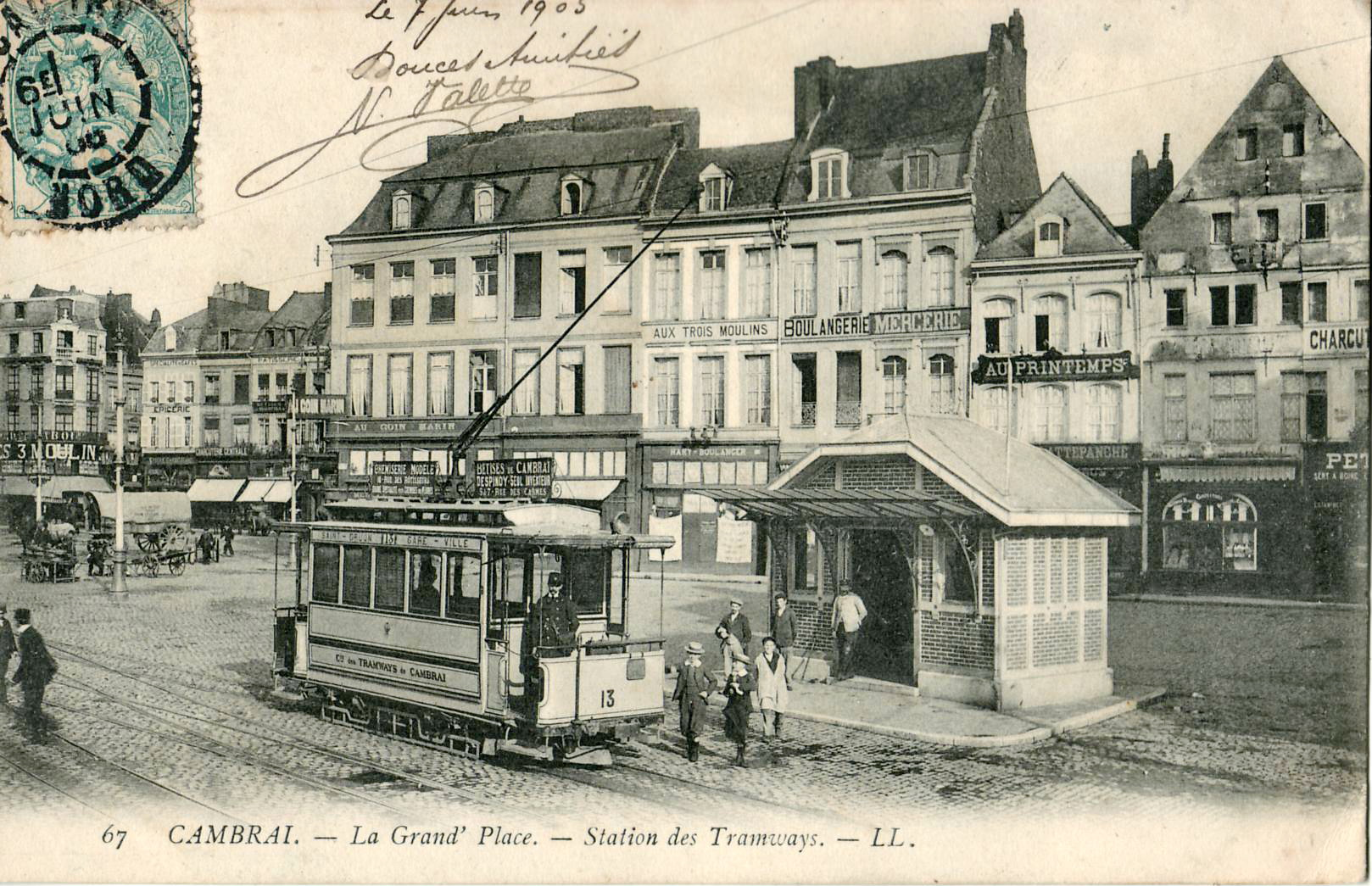
The tramway in 1905, in the main square

By 1897, that is, upon completion of the demolition of the fortifications, the city had considered the construction of electric tram lines. It was a very modern solution for the time, since electric traction only appeared in 1881 and the development of this mode of transport didn't truly occur until 1895 in Paris and the Paris region. In 1903, the network of the Compagnie des tramways de Cambrai was opened, 16 kilometres (9.9 mi) (Note: p.243) and with five lines. After World War I, the uneconomic network was not recommissioned.

Since 1933 the agglomeration of Cambrai has been served by a network of buses, five urban routes were operating in 2010, run by CFC (Railways of Cambrésis):

- A: Luxembourg – Cambrai stations – Escaudœuvres
- B: Neuville-Saint-Rémy – Cambrai stations – ZAC Cambrai-South
- C: Les Martigues-Pyrénées – Cambrai stations – Raillencourt-Sainte-Olle
- D: Cambrai stations – Raillencourt-Sainte-Olle
- E: ZAC Cambrai-South – Cambrai stations

Since 7 January 2013, the agglomeration community of Cambrai has implemented a free shuttle which serves seventeen stops around the city.

In 2008, the "Urban Transport Perimeter" (PTU) of Cambrai which, with 59,326 inhabitants, is the smallest of the twelve PTU of the Nord-Pas-de-Calais region had completed about 400,000 kilometres (250,000 mi) per year, corresponding to 740,000 journeys.

The agglomeration community of Cambrai is the organising authority of urban transport. However, while it has twenty-three communes, only six were served by urban transport in 2006. For other towns and cities, the urban community has delegated jurisdiction to the department.

In a relatively sparsely populated agglomeration with little extensive public transport, it cannot easily compete with the automobile. Nevertheless, the agglomeration community of Cambrai reflects on the future of urban transport from a perspective of sustainable development, with aims to strengthen the supply of public transport in order to capture a portion of travel by private car, and reducing car traffic and CO_{2} emissions. The realisation of the new multimodal transport hub in the quarter of the railway station of Cambrai is part of this policy.

== Urbanism ==
=== Urban morphology ===
==== Origins ====
The old centre of Cambrai was established on a small rise overlooking, from the right bank, the marshy area of the Scheldt Valley. Indications suggest that a castrum was built at this location, although the scarcity of excavations at Cambrai in has provided no archaeological evidence. With its area of 4.4 hectares (11 acres), the very modest castrum would've been much smaller than those of Boulogne at 13 hectares (32 acres) and Reims at 56 hectares (140 acres), for example.

==== Development ====
Faubourgs were developed, at the time of the Merovingian prosperity, to the north and west of the primitive castrum, around the churches of Saint-Vaast and Saint-Aubert. The looting of the city by the Vikings in December 880 convinced the Bishop Dodilon to strengthen and expand fortifications: The new enclosure he built tripled the size of the city. To the southeast, on a hillock called Mont-des-Bœufs, Bishop Gaugericus had founded an abbey in 595, originally dedicated to Saint Médard and Saint Loup, then, after the death of the founder, Gaugericus himself. This abbey was certainly also protected by an enclosure. The space which separated these two urban cores hosted markets and fairs.

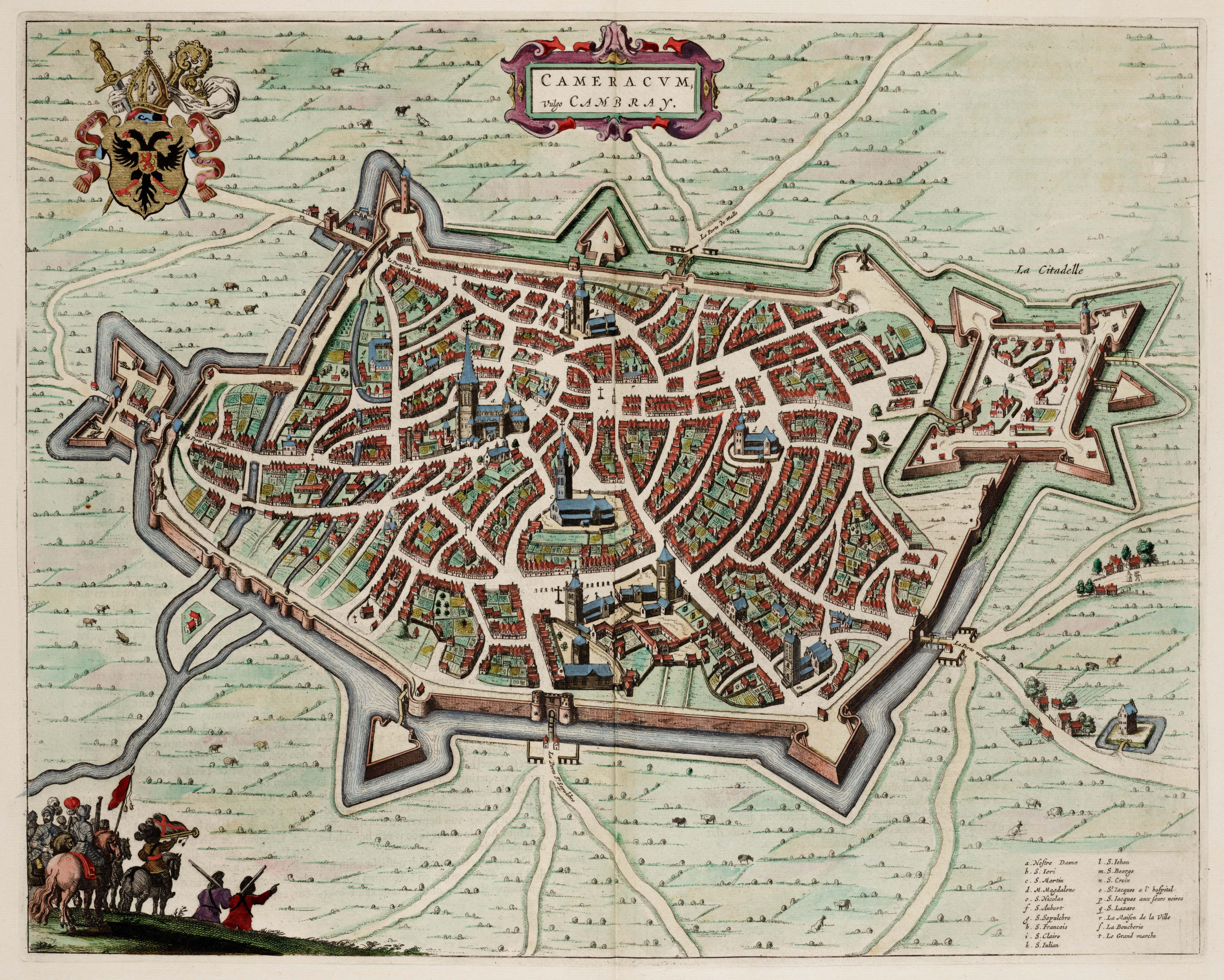
City map dating from 1649

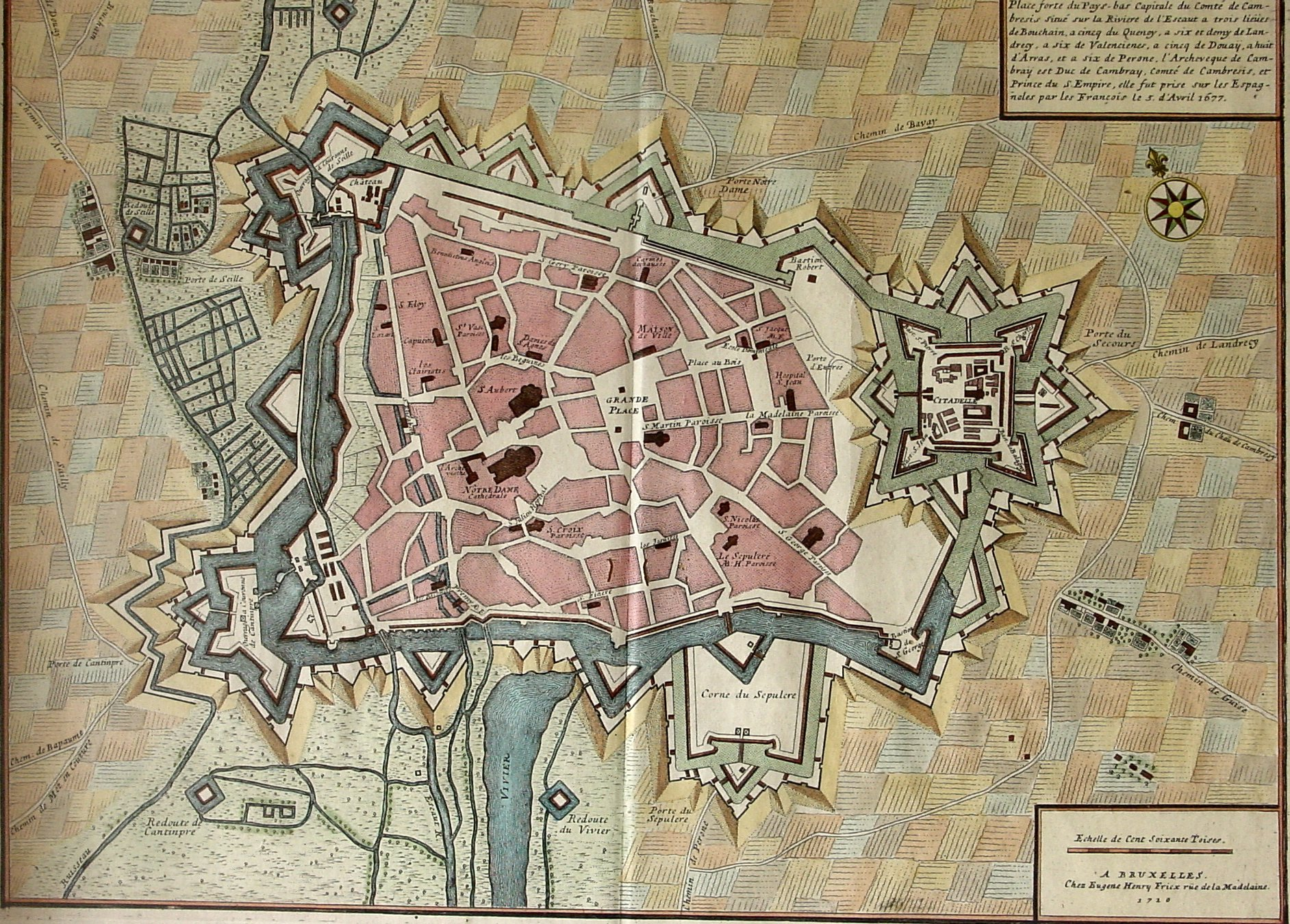
Map of 1710

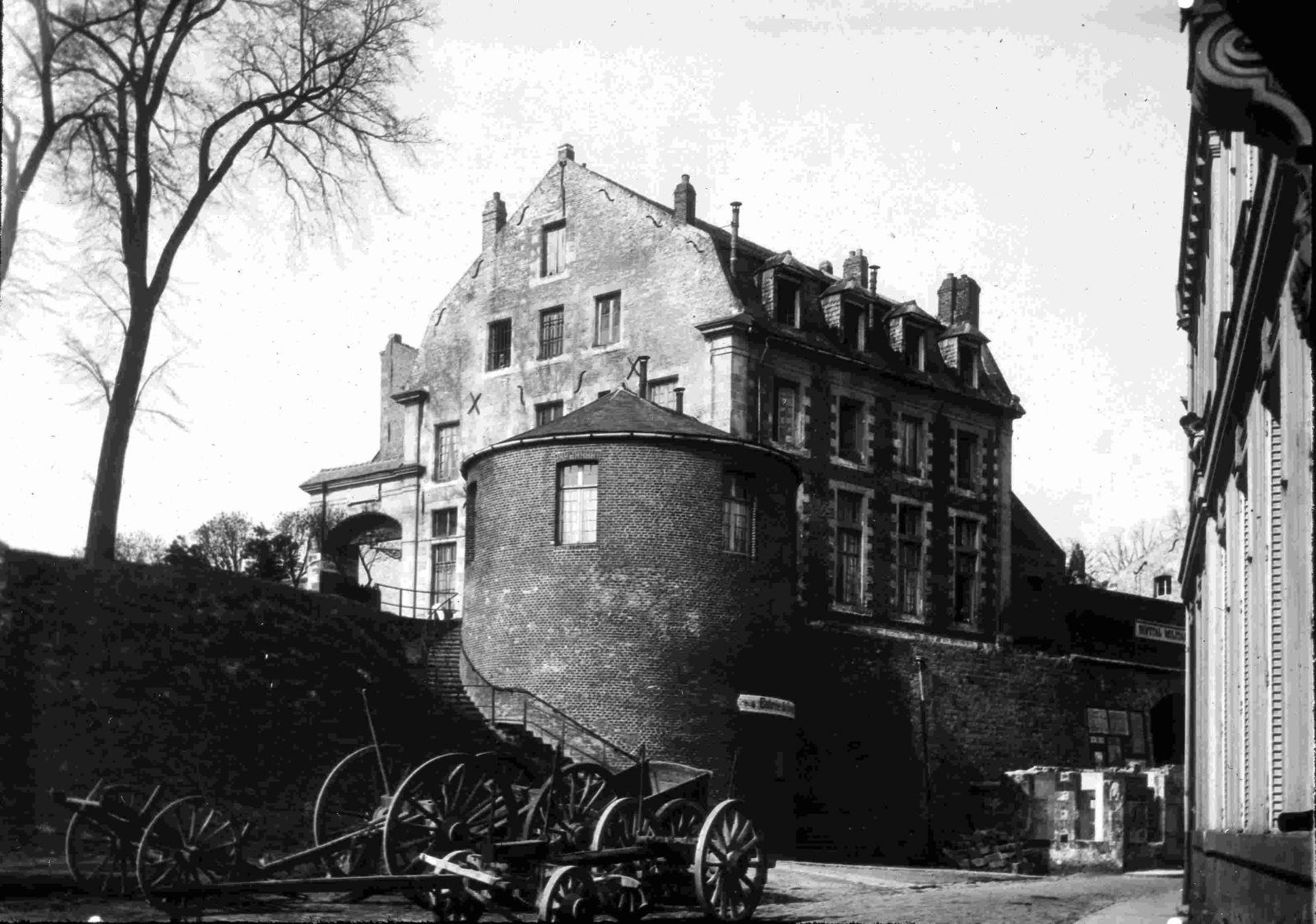
Chateau de Selles late 19th century

These two quarters were joined in the 11th century when Bishop Gérard I built the churches of Saint Nicolas and the Saint Sepulchre, southeast of the city and east of Mont-des-Bœufs. The Hôtel de Ville (town hall), the market, butcher and various bodies of craftsmen settled in this new urban space that Bishop Lietbert had protected by an earth rampart. Even today the Grand-place, the covered market, and a few names of streets (the Rue de Liniers, Rue des Rôtisseurs, Rue des Chaudronniers and Rue des Cordiers) recall this stage of urban development.

The Bishop Gérard II later replaced the earth rampart with a stone wall with towers, gates and ditches and encompassed the entire built space. Therefore Cambrai had reached the perimeter it would retain until the 19th century: While other cities in the region such as Bruges, Ghent or Douai expanded their enclosures until the 14th century, that of Cambrai was redesigned and reinforced, but without affecting the outline. (Note: p.355) The outline of this wall from the 11th century is still visible in the current boulevards.

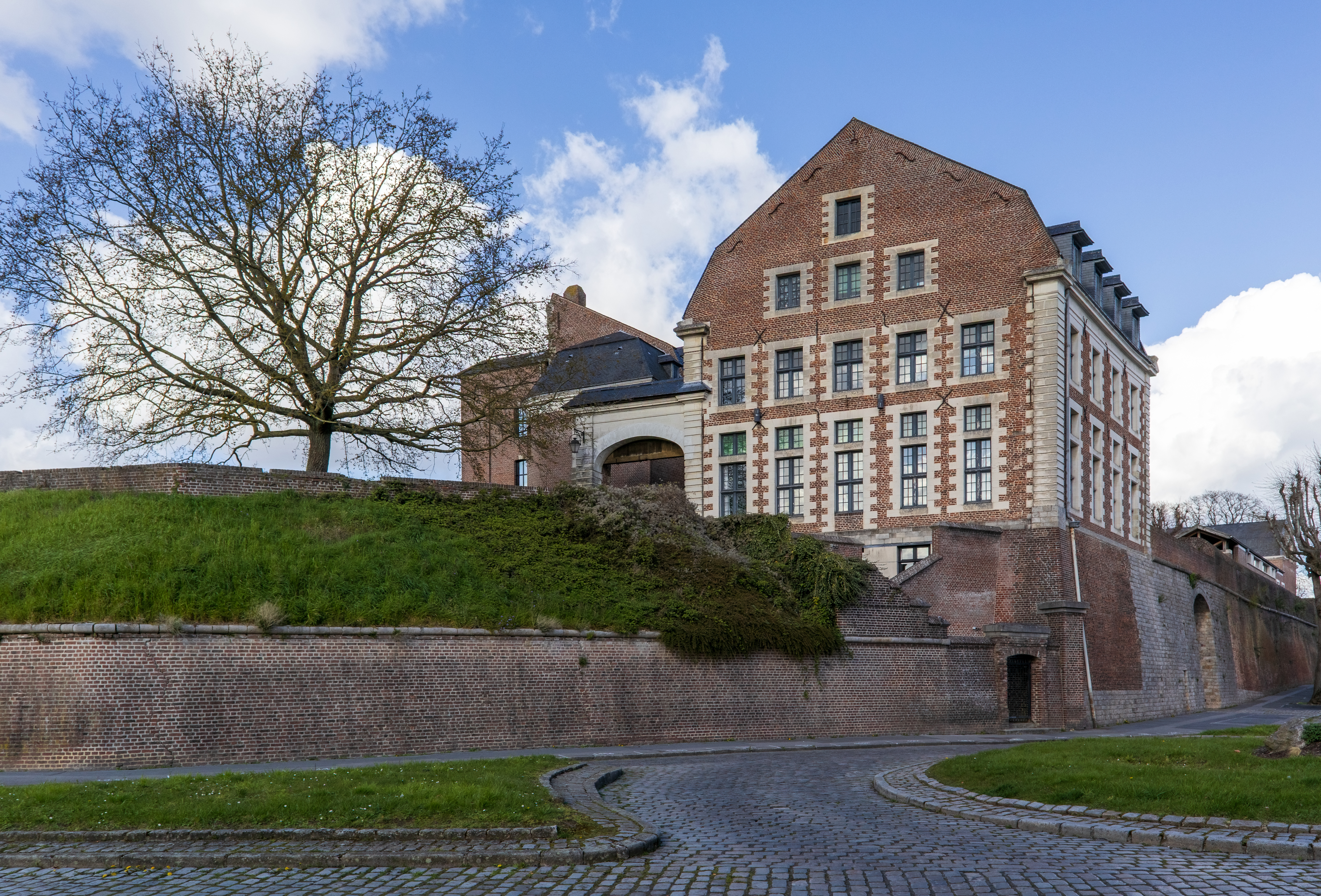
Selles Castle

It was probably under the episcopates of the bishops Gérard I, Liebert and Gérard II, in the 11th century, that was built the Château de Selles, a fortress located on the edge of the Scheldt to the northwest of the city. In the 13th century, the Bishop Nicolas III de Fontaines ordered work to put it "on a good foot of defence". This castle, owned by the bishop-counts, was intended as much to monitor the city as to ensure the defence. Its military role ended in the 16th century, when Charles V grabbed the city and ordered the construction, on Mont-des-Bœufs northeast of the town, of a citadel for which 800 houses were demolished along with the Abbey of Saint Gaugericus. (Note: p.106) The Château de Selles was then used as a prison.

==== Dismantling of fortifications ====
In the 19th century, the city was cramped within its fortified walls, which limited its development and prohibited any urban planning.

Cambrai is one of the most inaccessible cities imaginable; its fortifications have a formidable appearance when it follows covered paths narrow and tortuous, crossing ditches filled by the Scheldt. Walls of extraordinary height enclose. The entrances, similar to tunnels, and barely sufficient for a car, lead to the city. All this overseen by a very daunting citadel built on top of Mont Saint-Géry.

— Ardouin-Dumazet, written in 1890. (Note: p.192.)

The dismantling of the fortifications, requested by petition as early as 1862, was finally accepted by the State after a further 30 years. (Note: p.236-240.) The work lasted 6 years and transformed the appearance of the city by the construction of a belt of wide boulevards, the sale of new land to build, connecting the city to its suburbs and the establishment of public gardens.

==== Drainage work ====
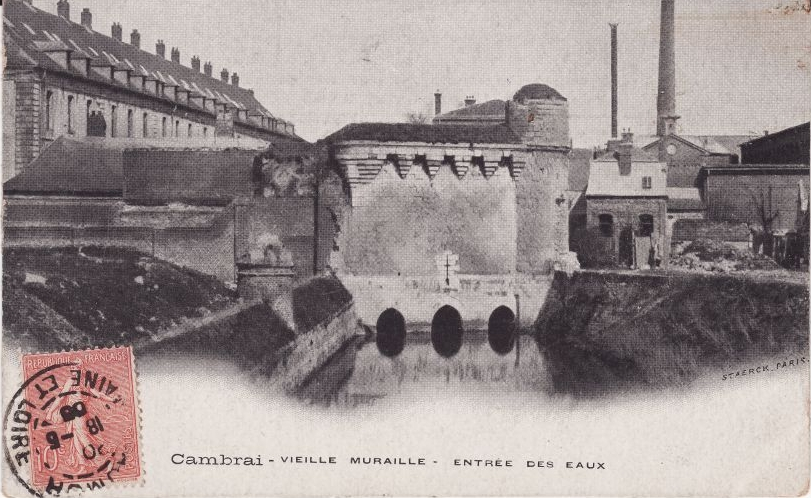
Entry of the Scheldt into the city through the gate of Arquets (postcard from the early 20th century)

Cambrai is built on the edge of the wide marshy area of the Scheldt Valley encircling the western part of the city, the Château de Selles to the north at the gate of the Holy Sepulchre in the south: Wet gardens, ponds, meadows, ponds and marsh formed a flood zone sometimes also used for the defence of the city. The suburb of Cantimpré, linking the ancient heart to the Scheldt below to the west, had raised several metres. The two arms of the Scheldt (Escaut), the Escautins, are separated before entering the medieval town: The Escauette and the Clicotiau, which bathed the walls of the old urban core. These streams were probably due to man's hand because they do not correspond to natural landforms. However, it is unknown whether their origin dates back to the Roman era or is from a later time.

Throughout the Middle Ages, and again in modern times, the Scheldt and its arms required constant work: Repair of levees, enhancement of pavement, straightening of the bed, as well as the digging of ditches to regulate the course of the river, prevent floods and ensure as far as possible a steady water level, on which the mills and tanneries depended. Despite these works, floods were frequent. The absorption of rainwater and household water descending from the upper areas of the city was also a problem. Bouly spoke in 1842, in his History of Cambrai and le Cambrésis, of "fast torrents [stormwater] formed today by rolling up the Scheldt". In the Middle Ages the "flow of el kayère" (or "flow of the chair"), (Note: So named because of the neighboring infamy chair) close to the current Grand-Place, was dug a reservoir for "water courses of the falling waters of the sky", i.e. to control the flow of rainwater. In the 19th century aqueducts were built to carry these waters, and the streets were paved. Furthermore, in 1926 a drainage sewer was built at Rue Blériot.

The draining of the wetlands that surround the town began in 1804. The work ended in 1951 with the drying of the small stream of Saint Benoît near the Liberty Stadium, itself built on this wetland which dominated the ancient city walls, and in 1953 with the covering of the Clicotiau.

==== The 20th century ====
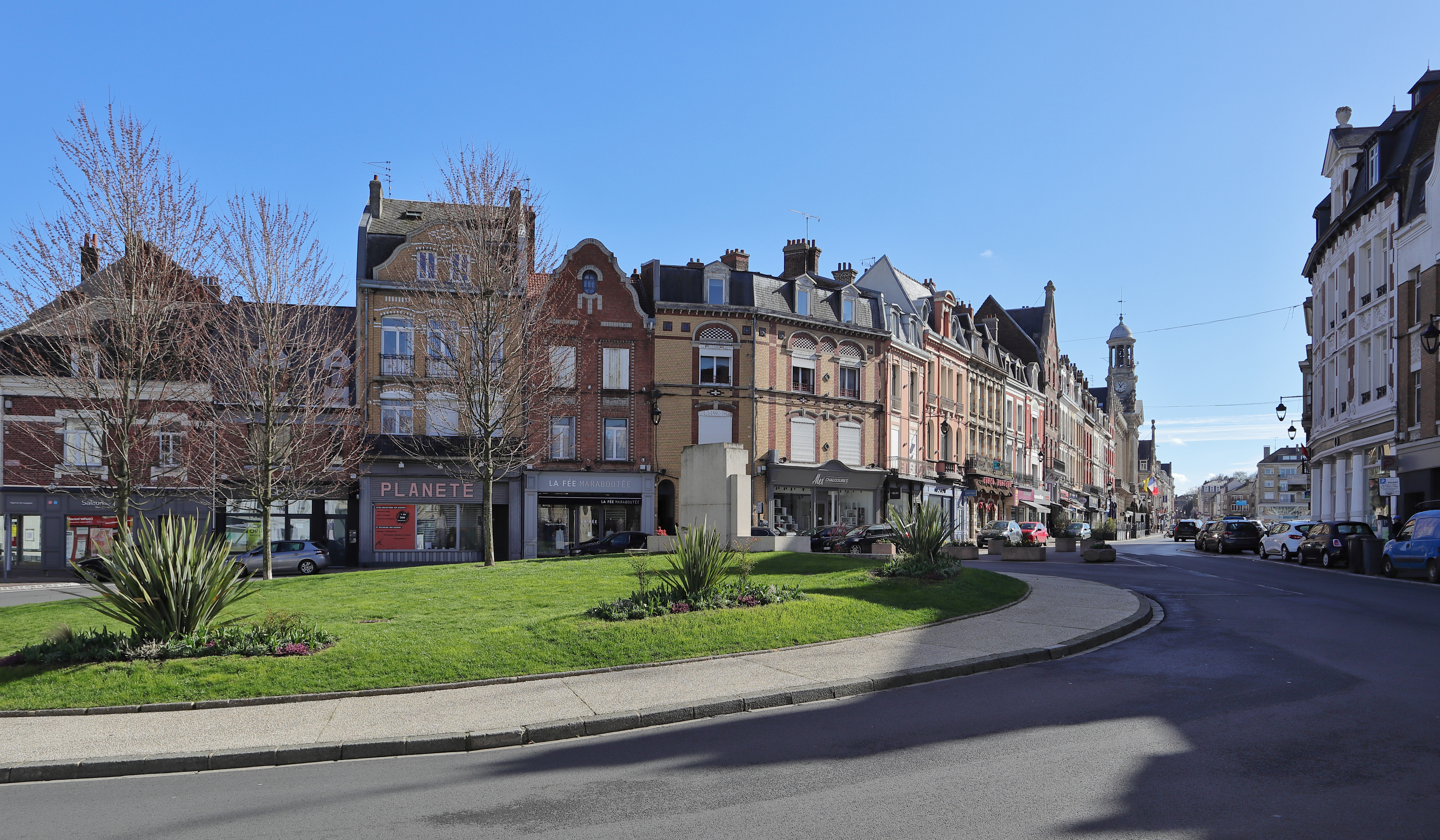
The reconstruction imposes a regional style

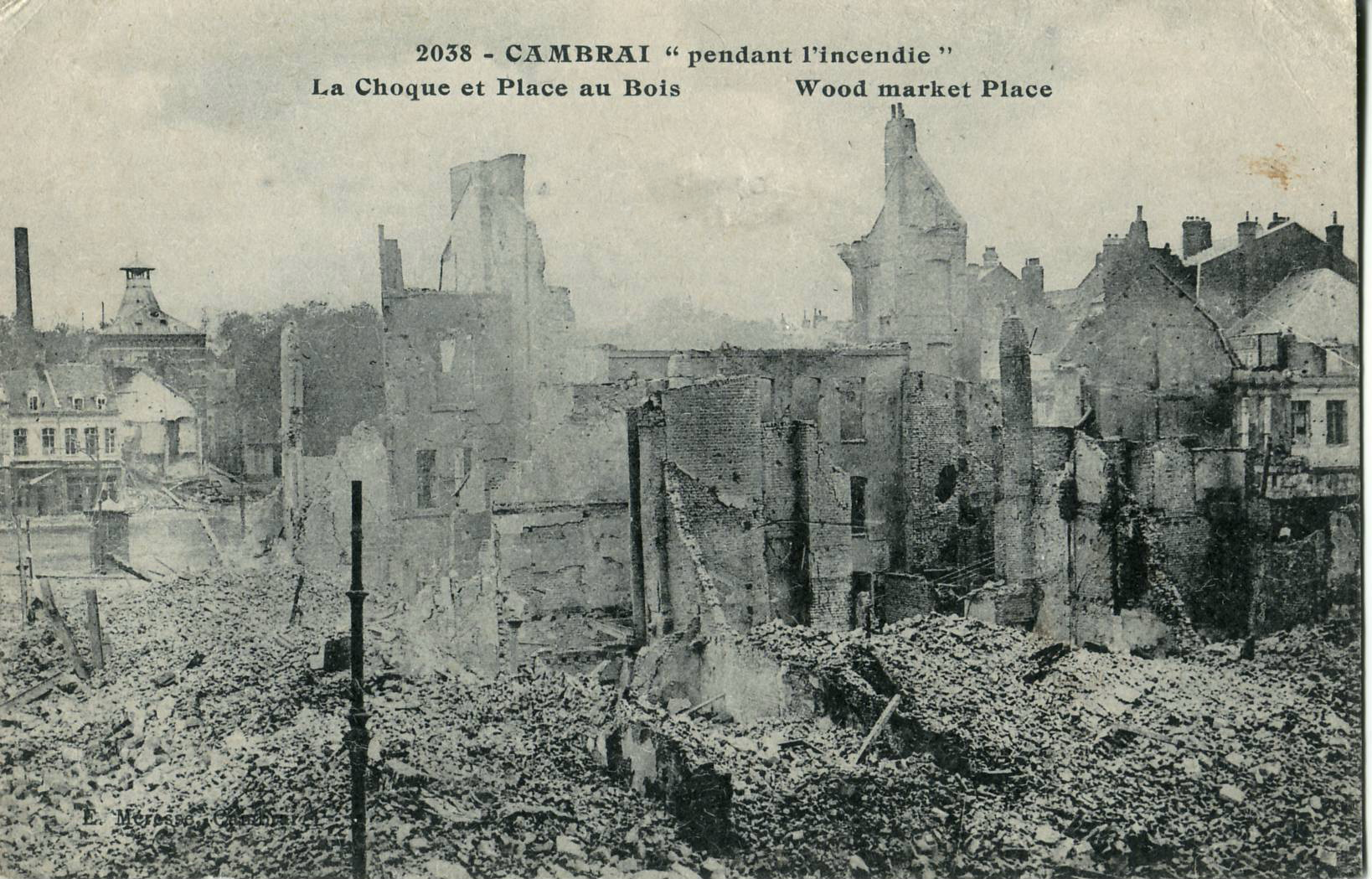
Ruins of the town centre, in 1917

The destruction caused by World War I necessitated a reconstruction of the centre. The municipality organised a competition, which was won by Pierre Leprince-Ringuet. His project, inspired with both a regionalist taste and the Hausmannian style, completely redesigned the layout of roads from the Middle Ages. It was rebuilt as a modern city. The architect Louis Marie Cordonnier described the prospects to elected representatives:

The centre of the city is completely razed and destroyed. So, you have free rein. Your duty is to remake a city pleasant, modern, retaining its character. Acting otherwise would be a crime for which you would be responsible to future generations. Your streets were narrow, twisty: Straighten them, adjust them, expand them. Your houses were awkward, obscure, unhealthy: Enforce in your specifications the requirements for hygiene, for ventilation, for lighting.

— Louis Marie Cordonnier, La Vie des Cambrésiens [The Life of the People of Cambrai] (Note: quote p.199)

The Leprince-Ringuet plan was only partially achieved, but the streets were removed, others expanded, and new paths were created as the Avenue de la Victoire [Avenue of Victory].

Further destruction due to the Allied bombing of April–August 1944 again required a reconstruction. It was especially, in the years following World War II, to rehouse the victims and to cope with the expanding population. Priority was given to detached houses, and new quarters appeared, such as the "Martin–Martine" subdivision south-east of the city. In the 1980s, the municipality worked to restore and develop the ancient heritage.

=== Housing ===
Cambrai had 18,112 housing units in 2017, of which 15,925 were occupied as primary residences. The proportion of individual housing is 54.2%. Primary residences dominate with 87.9%, and one can especially note the very low proportion of secondary residences in Cambrai: 1.0%.

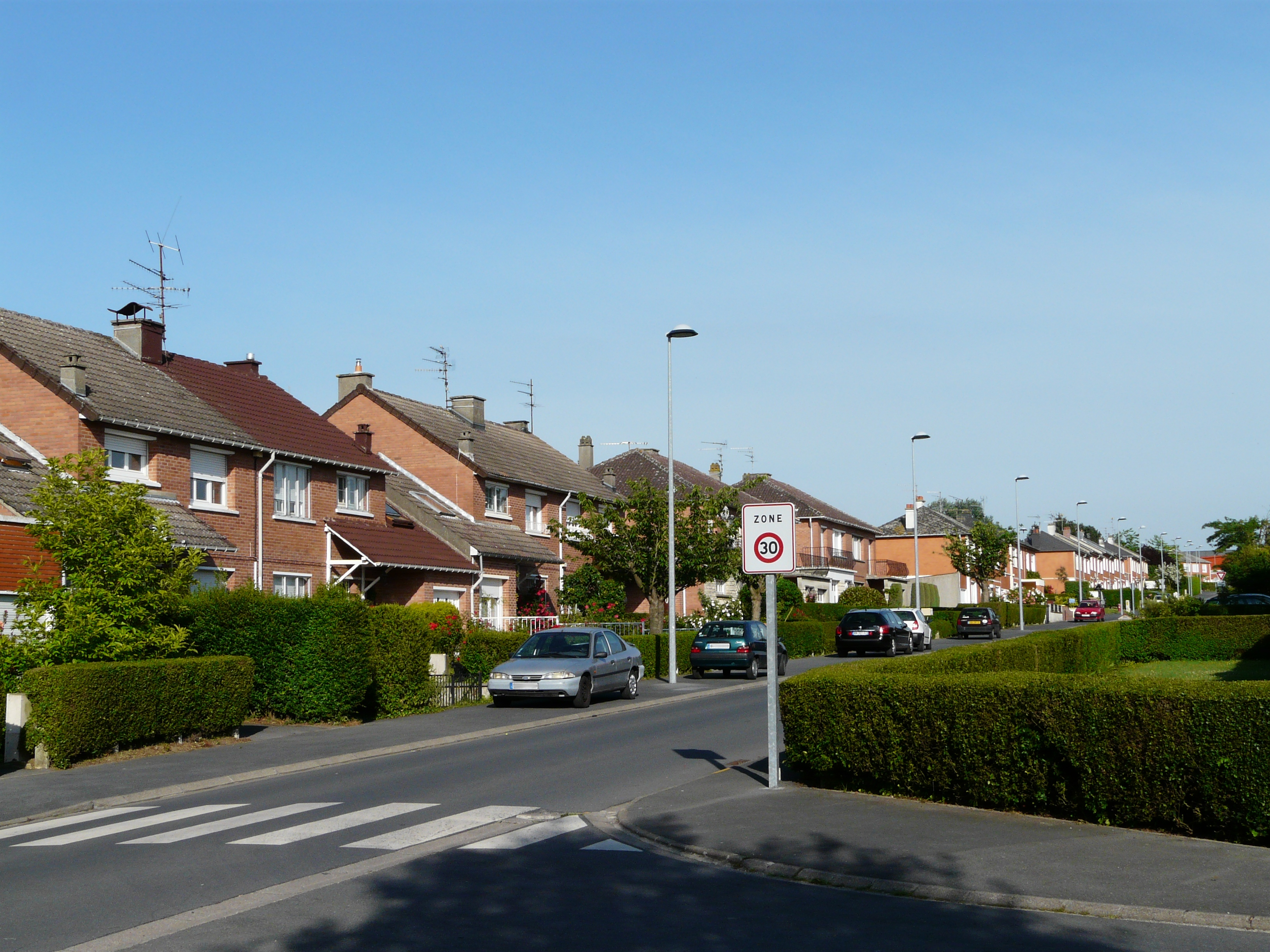
A street of houses in the subdivision "Martin Martine" constructed by the Maison Familiale group, characteristic habitat of the years 1960–1970

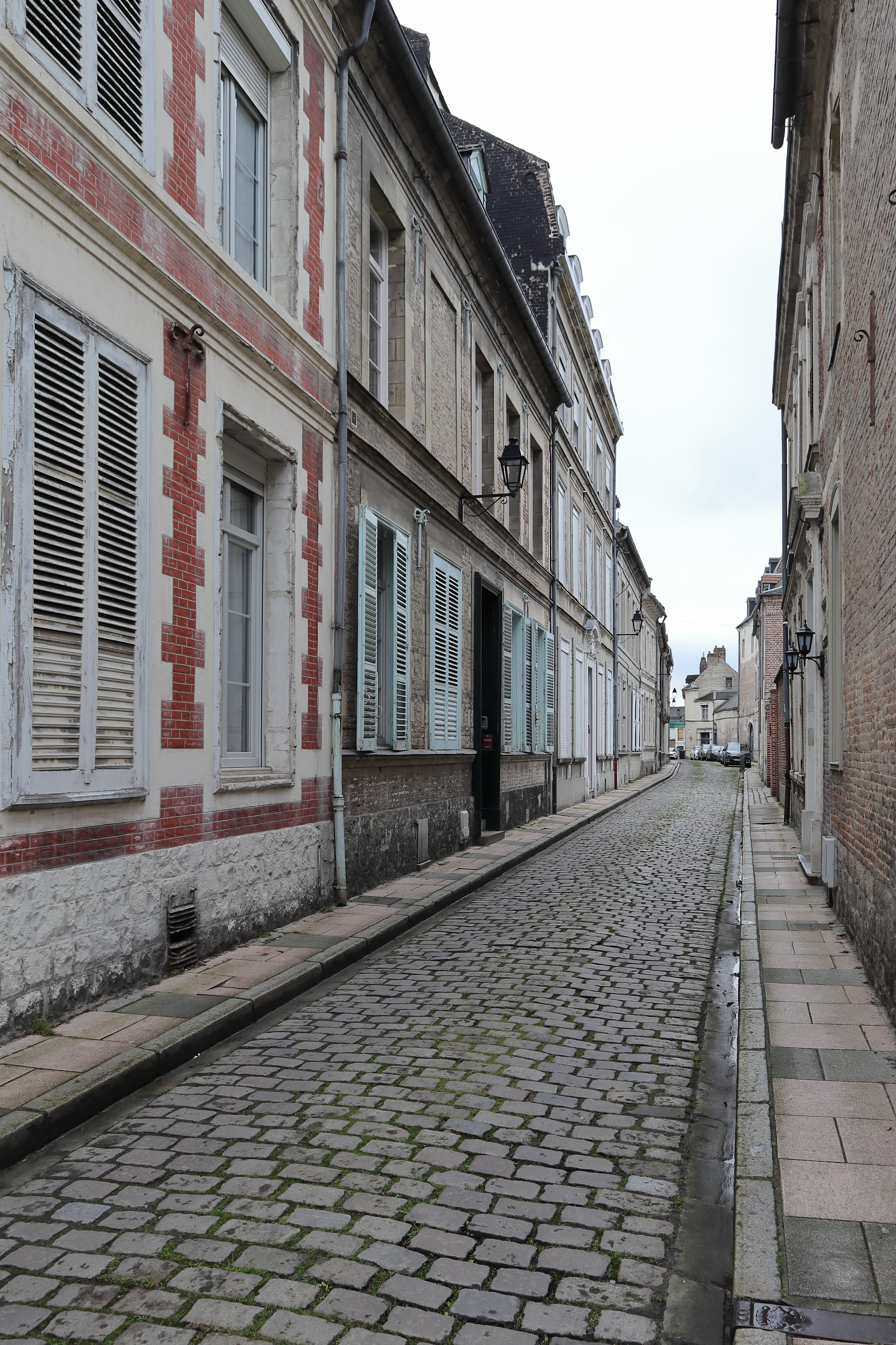
The old Cambrai

The proportion of house owners, at 44.3%, is lower than in the rest of the country (57.5%). The tenants are much more numerous, 54.1% in Cambrai, against little more than 40% in France. Among rental housing, the proportion of HLM housing, at 16.7%, is significantly higher than the national average of 14.8%.

The age of the accommodation in Cambrai is distinguished from both regional and national averages. Housing is older, on average, in Cambrai than in the rest of the country. The proportion of (pre-1945) "old" housing, is 33.5%, which is significantly higher than the French average of 22.2%. Meanwhile, dwellings built between 1946 and 1970 account for 37.0% of the total in Cambrai, significantly above the 21.5% of the country. This proportion can probably be explained by the necessary reconstruction which followed the destruction of World War II, as well as programmes of Maison Familiale group homes in the 1960s and 1970s. More recent housing is relatively less in the city than in the rest of France or even in the region: 7.3% of accommodation in Cambrai was built between 1991 and 2005, compared with 16.1% in France; 5.2% have been built since 2006, compared with 10.9% in France. This is probably a consequence of the less dynamic economy and population of the city in recent years.

The agglomeration community seeks to improve the quality of the accommodation by various means: Encourage rehabilitation of vacant properties, expand available accommodation which is suitable for elderly or handicapped people, increase the supply of rentals and promote the construction of more energy-efficient housing. The creation of 960 new social houses was provided over six years, from 2008 to 2014.

The Urban social cohesion contract signed in 2007 with the city and the urban community was the first of the Nord department. Five quarters, not classified as "sensitive urban areas", are concerned: The old centre where old habitat remains, the l'Amérique and La Forêt estates, consisting primarily of multi-family housing, and the d'Esnes and de Guise estates dominated by single-family housing.

=== Development projects ===
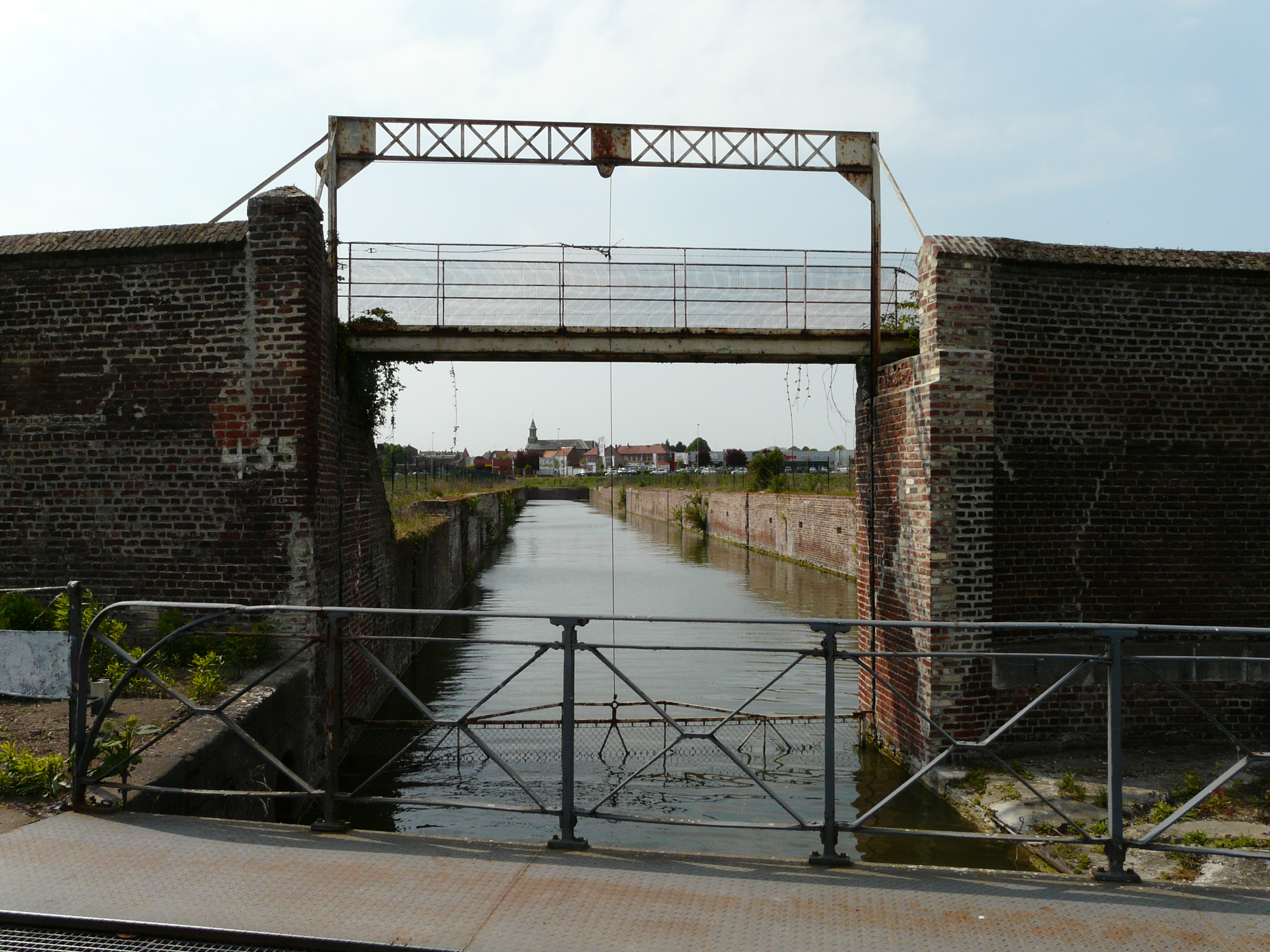
The entrance from the Scheldt canal, the canal which serves the old docks and warehouses of Cambrai

In 2010, the projects of the municipality include:

- The "docks and warehouses," Brownfield site of 5 hectares (12 acres) at the edge of the Saint-Quentin canal, the assignment of which has not yet been determined but which should essentially be devoted to recreation.
- The rehabilitation of the centre of the Martin–Martine quarter, and in particular the transformation of the green corridor which was originally reserved for an "urban expressway", never realised.
- The layout of the Place du 9-Octobre around the Church of Saint-Géry [Saint Gaugericus]
- The redevelopment of the station quarter in the "exchange hub": A study on the development of the multimodal trade hub of Cambrai was launched in 2007 by the agglomeration community of Cambrai in partnership with the city, the Northern Department and the region, with purpose the station District redevelopment and improvement of intermodality.
- The relocation of the library to new premises.
- The "modernisation" of the public garden.

On the other hand, the local urbanism plan revolves around eight themes: "Cambrai, an urban centre in the countryside", "Preserve and enhance the natural, rural and agricultural space", "Reclaim and restructure", "Render Cambrai fully in its urbanity", "Build upon the city of history", "Save and protect the environment, improve the quality of the living environment", "Ensuring economic and sustainable development", and also "Mastering travel or promoting changes in modes of transport".

== Toponymy ==
The location is attested as Camaracum in the 4th century in the Peutinger Table and Cameracum (no date). It recognises the Gallo-Roman suffix of Celtic origin -acum "place of", "property of", preceded by an element not identified with certainty. Albert Dauzat and Charles Rostaing offered the Gallo-Roman type name of a person called Camarus.

This is also found in the anthroponym of Chambray (Eure) (Cambracus 1011, Cameragus to 1025). Variants Cambarius and Camarius would also explain Cambayrac, Chambry in Aine and the same in Seine-et-Marne, Chamery, Chémery, etc. François de Beaurepaire notes that it may also be a pre-Latin camar or cambar theme. However, Xavier Delamarre cited the personal name Cambarius, which he considers as based on the Gallic word cambo- "curve" (cf. old Irish camb, camm "curved", "bent" or "twisted"). Camarus would be a variant of this Gallic nickname meaning "that which is curved".

The Cambrai shape is Normanno-Picard with a hard "C", characteristic of the north of the Joret line and therefore corresponds to the form of Francien type Chambray. In addition, the name of the town was written Cambray until the French Revolution.

It is known under the name of Kamerijk in Dutch and formerly Kamerich in German and Camberick/Cambrick in English.

== Politics and administration ==
=== Political trends and results ===
Overall, voting in Cambrai is little different from the national vote, but the abstention rate is often higher: For example, it was 34.86% in the 2005 referendum (against 30.63%); 22.07% in the first round of the 2007 presidential election (compared with 16.23%) and 38.13% in the first round of the legislative elections of 2002 (compared to 35.58%).

Cambresiens voters seem also more cautious with regard to the European Union and the French in general: The referendum on the ratification of the Treaty on European Union of 1992 was rejected by 53.35%, while at the national level it was approved by a narrow majority of 51.04%. In 2005, the draft law on the ratification of the Treaty establishing a Constitution for Europe was rejected more widely in Cambrai (59.8% of voted "No") than at the national level (54.67%).

In the presidential election of 2007 the results of the second round were very close to national figures: 54.07% for Nicolas Sarkozy and 45.93% for Ségolène Royal, against respectively 53.06% and 46.94% at the national level. In the first round Jean-Marie Le Pen achieved a slightly better result at Cambrai (13.28%) than France (10.44%), while François Bayrou was in a reversed situation (16.77% against 18.57%). Arlette Laguiller (2.02%) and Olivier Besancenot (4.77%) were the only other candidates to exceed 1.5%. In the second round of the presidential election of 2002 Jacques Chirac arrived largely in the lead in Cambrai as in the rest of the country but Jean-Marie Le Pen's result was higher (21.11% against 17.79%).

In the legislative elections of 2007, François-Xavier Villain, the candidate related to the UMP and who was also the incumbent Mayor of Cambrai, achieved 57.42% in the first round (48.03% in the constituency). All the other candidates were below the national percentage of their party. For example, the Socialist Party achieved 22.91% against 24.73%, the Communist Party at 3.10% compared to 4.29% and the UDF at 6.21% against 7.61%. The decline of the National Front was also more marked in Cambrai (4.14%) than elsewhere (4.24%). One finds a situation close to the 2002 elections.

In the first round of the presidential election of 2012, the four candidates in the lead in Cambrai were Nicolas Sarkozy (UMP, 28.29%), François Hollande (PS, 27.56%), Marine Le Pen (FN, 20.81%) and Jean-Luc Mélenchon (Left Front, 10.14%) with a turnout of 72.61%. In the second round, François Hollande was in the lead with 50.75% of the vote, with a participation rate of 73.09%.

=== Municipal government ===
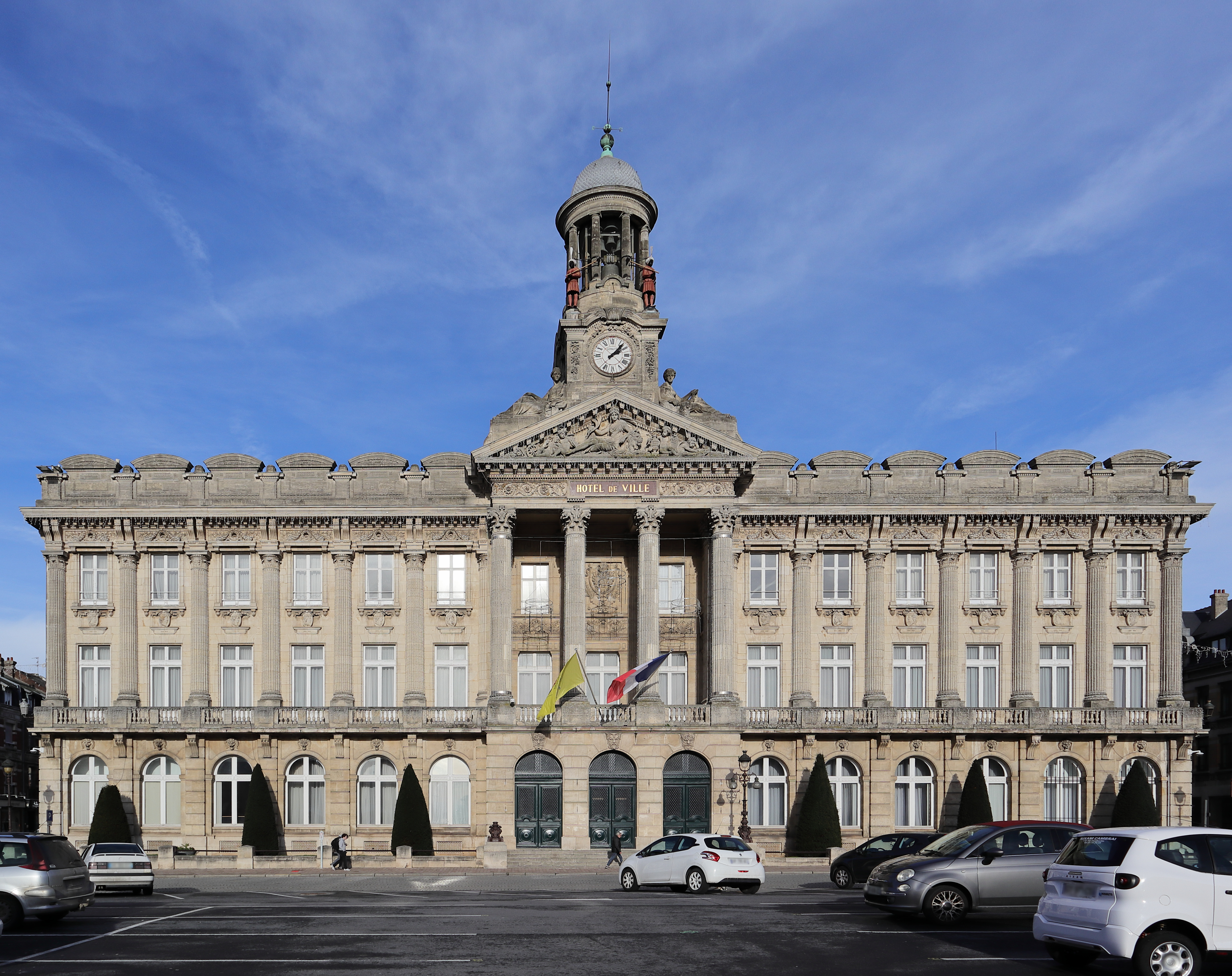
The city hall, inaugurated in 1932

Cambrai is the chef-lieu of one of the six arrondissements in the Nord department. Cambrai is also the seat of the canton of Cambrai, which consists of 27 communes (including Cambrai).

Since 22 December 1992, Cambrai is the seat of the Agglomeration Community of Cambrai which includes 33 communes and approximately 68,000 inhabitants. The city also adheres to the following intercommunal structures:

- The Intercommunal Association of Sanitation of the Cambrai Agglomeration (SIAC).
- SIVU "Scènes mitoyennes" ["Adjoining Stages"], created in August 2000, brings together the communes of Cambrai, Caudry, Escaudœuvres and Neuville-Saint-Rémy with which it harmonises cultural policies.
- SIVU "Murs mitoyens" ["Adjoining Walls"], operational since 1 January 2006 and headquartered in Caudry, its mission is to educate the various planning authorities for the two cities.
- The Intercommunity Association of the energy of the Cambrésis (SIDEC), which is headquartered at Neuville-Saint-Rémy, brings together the 111 communes in the arrondissement. It concedes the management of the public service energy distribution to ERDF and manages the work of strengthening and concealment of networks.
- The Scheme of territorial coherence (SCoT) of le Cambrésis (via the agglomeration community of Cambrai).
- The Joint Association for the Enhancement of the Upper Scheldt (via the agglomeration community of Cambrai).

Cambrai was merged with the commune of Morenchies in 1971.

=== List of mayors ===
Since 1945, Cambrai has had three mayors. The city, after having constantly re-elected a Socialist mayor from the Liberation until 1977 in the person of Raymond Gernez, has since been administered by mayors from RPR or the related UMP: Jacques Legendre until 1992, then François-Xavier Villain. The latter was elected to the 18th constituency in Nord on 16 June 2002 and re-elected in 2007 and 2012.

List of mayors of Cambrai
Start	End	Name	Party	Other details
20 May 1945	20 March 1977	Raymond Gernez	SFIO then PS	Député of Nord (1958–1973)
20 March 1977	October 1992	Jacques Legendre	RPR	Député of Nord (1973–1981), Minister, Senator
18 October 1992	In progress	François-Xavier Villain	RPR related, then UDI	Député of Nord (2002–); Re-elected for the 2014–2020 term.

=== Judicial and administrative authorities ===
Cambrai was for a short time the seat of the Parlement of French Flanders, from 1709 until its transfer to Douai in 1713.

The city is now within the jurisdiction of the Court of Appeal of Douai. It is the seat of a high court whose jurisdiction coincides with the boundaries of the arrondissement, a Tribunal d'instance and an industrial tribunal, installed in the restored Château de Selles. With the reform of the judicial map launched in 2007 the city has lost its commercial court and is linked to that of Douai.

=== Environmental policy ===
The environmental policy is one of the competences of the Community of the agglomeration of Cambrai.

== Twin towns and sister cities ==
Cambrai is twinned with:

- Pushkin, Saint Petersburg, Russia
- Châteauguay, Canada, since 1980
- (England) Gravesham, United Kingdom, since 1989
- Esztergom, Hungary, since 1991
- Cieszyn, Poland

== Population ==
=== Demographics ===
Historical population

Year	Pop.	±% p.a.
1793	15,427	—
1800	13,799	−1.58%
1806	15,608	+2.07%
1821	15,851	+0.10%
1831	17,646	+1.08%
1836	17,848	+0.23%
1841	20,141	+2.45%
1846	20,648	+0.50%
1851	21,344	+0.67%
1856	21,405	+0.06%
1861	22,557	+1.05%
1866	22,207	−0.31%
1872	22,897	+0.51%

Year	Pop.	±% p.a.
1876	22,079	−0.91%
1881	23,448	+1.21%
1886	23,881	+0.37%
1891	24,122	+0.20%
1896	25,250	+0.92%
1901	26,586	+1.04%
1906	27,832	+0.92%
1911	28,077	+0.18%
1921	26,023	−0.76%
1926	29,193	+2.33%
1931	28,542	−0.45%
1936	29,655	+0.77%
1946	26,129	−1.26%

Year	Pop.	±% p.a.
1954	29,567	+1.56%
1962	32,897	+1.34%
1968	37,584	+2.24%
1975	39,049	+0.55%
1982	35,272	−1.44%
1990	33,092	−0.79%
1999	33,738	+0.22%
2007	32,296	−0.54%
2012	32,847	+0.34%
2017	32,558	−0.18%
2023	31,134	−0.74%

From 1962 to 1999: Population without double counting; for the years following: municipal population.
Source: Ldh/EHESS/Cassini (1793-1999) and INSEE (1968-2023)

The urban unit (unité urbaine) of Cambrai had 45,812 inhabitants in 2022, and the urban area (aire urbaine) 93,174 inhabitants. In other less populated regions, Cambrai would be an important city, but in Nord-Pas-de-Calais, densely populated and urbanised, the city and its suburbs come far behind Lille (1,143,125 inhabitants), Douai-Lens (552,682), Valenciennes (399,677), Dunkirk (265,974) and Maubeuge (125,000).

The population of Cambrai increased little over the centuries: Estimated at 10,000 souls in the 15th century, it is, according to a memorandum of intendant who described it as "very diminished", at 12,000 in 1698. At the end of the Revolution, in 1801, it was still only approximately 15,000 inhabitants.

It increased slowly but steadily throughout the 19th century with a net decline in the early 20th century: the birth rate, as everywhere else in France, declined. At the same time, infant mortality remained high (20.3% in 1900, 10.2% on the eve of the war), (Note: p.247) which explains the low natural growth.

The population growth resumed at a rapid pace between the end of World War II and the beginning of the 1970s (the Trente Glorieuses), through natural increase (baby boomers and sharp decline of infant mortality) and the rural exodus, which slowly emptied the villages of Cambrésis of their population (partial) towards the town of Cambrai. This dynamism, however, showed however signs of stalling since 1968: in fact, the progress of jobs (+27.5% from 1952 to 1975) did not follow that of the population (+44.2%). (Note: p.281)

The curve was brutally reversed by the 1973 oil crisis. The city's population plummeted from the 1975 census, net migration which was largely positive in the 1960s became negative, while the natural balance, which remains positive, tends to shrink. Many traditional activities have disappeared (chocolate production, brewery, chicory, weaving, metallurgy, etc.), representing several thousand jobs.

Demographic evolution 1968–2023
Period	1968–1975	1975–1982	1982–1990	1990–1999	1999–2007	2007–2012	2012–2017	2017–2023
Average annual population change in %	+0.5	−1.4	−0.8	+0.2	−0.6	+0.3	−0.2	−0.7
Due to natural increase	+1.1	+0.7	+0.5	+0.4	+0.4	+0.2	-0.0	-0.3
Due to net migration	−0.6	−2.1	−1.3	−0.1	−1.0	+0.1	−0.2	-0.4

==== Age structure ====
The graphics below represent the age structure in 2023 of the population of the commune of Cambrai, and of the Nord department. The population of Cambrai is relatively old.

Population by age of Cambrai, 2023 (%)

80+	7.6
65–79	16.7
55–64	13.1
40–54	18.7
25–39	15.6
15–24	13.4
0–14	14.8

Total: 99.9

male

female

Source: INSEE

Population by age of Nord, 2023 (%)

90+	4.8
75–89	13.3
60–74	11.8
45–59	19
30–44	18.7
15–29	13.9
0–14	18.4

Total: 99.9

male

female

Source: INSEE

==== Population distribution ====
The population distribution of Cambrai (active population aged 15 or more in employment) by socio-professional category showed an under-representation of managers and higher intellectual professionals (10.0%) with the French average (16.3%), in 2017, and vice versa slightly higher proportions of manual workers (28.3% compared with 21.5%) and employees (30.2% against 28.5%). The proportion of intermediate professionals is lower (22.8% against 24.8%). The percentage of farmers is naturally low in Cambrai (0.2%).

The distribution of the population over the age of 15 years, and not enrolled in study, showed lower education rates than those of metropolitan France in 2017, most significantly in the higher levels (Baccalauréat or Bac+5 years of study).

Population not in training over the age of 15 by qualification (%)
Level	Cambrai	France
No tuition or any diploma	27.4	22.8
BEPC or equiv.	6.7	5.6
CAP or BEP	25.7	24.8
Bac or BP	16.9	16.9
Bac+2	9.6	10.9
Bac+3 or +4	7.8	8.9
Bac+5 or more	5.9	10.1

== Education ==
Cambrai is the seat of a pool of training divided into three districts (Cambrai-North, Cambrai-South and Cambrai-Le Cateau) and dependent on the Education Authorities of Nord and the Academy of Lille.

=== Schools ===
The city administers twelve nursery schools, and eleven elementary schools.

The department manages four colleges: Jules-Ferry, Fénelon, Lamartine and Paul-Duez.

The Nord-Pas-de-Calais region operates four high schools: Fénelon, Paul-Duez and the vocational Louise de Bettignies and Louis-Blériot. Cambrai also has a private institution, the ensemble of Saint-Luc, bringing together three former private schools merged in September 2009: Collège Jeanne d'Arc, Institution Notre Dame de Grace (college and high school of general and technological education) and the vocational high school La Sagresse.

=== University life ===
Cambrai hosts two branches of the University of Valenciennes and Hainaut-Cambresis (UVHC), and Lille-2.

UVHC antenna prepares eleven diplomas, which include of DUT, IUP, Master Pro, professional licenses (including "Cultural Actions and Promotion of Heritage" and "Trades of Archaeology") and licenses.

The branch of Lille-2 prepares to obtain a license "mention droit" or "mention economic and social administration", as well as three professional licenses: For management of small-medium businesses, for transportation of goods and for security professions.

Finally, Catholic teaching. The whole of Saint Luc de Cambrai was a centre of higher education (Sup'Sagesse) from Bac+1 to Bac+5: BTS optician, BTS insurance, NRC, MUC, AG and AM, two professional licenses ("Operational Marketing Manager" and "Contingency Insurance and Management of Goods") and finally a Professional Master of "Entrepreneurial Strategy and Management", opened to the entrepreneurs.

With nearly 500 students in alternation, learning or school track, Sup'Sagesse is a real city centre campus, incorporating a boarding school.

Other institutions of higher education in Cambrai are the Ecole Supérieure of Art of Cambrai and the Institute of Nursing Education.

Among the alumni of the École des Beaux-Arts of Cambrai are Marie-Anne and Ludovic Belleval who are now both the Lamour Mill's owners and curators in Briastre.

== Health ==
Medical density is quite good at Cambrai, when compared with the regional and national averages. In the agglomeration community there are 2.04 general practitioners per 1,000 inhabitants (Nord Pas-de-Calais region and metropolitan France 1.65), and 1.98 specialist doctors per 1,000 inhabitants (region: 1.39, metropolitan France: 1.74).

The Saint-Julien hospital, which housed the poor and the sick, was founded in 1070. Today it remains as a chapel adjoining the municipal theatre. Over the following centuries, other hospitals were founded: The Saint-Lazare Hospital for lepers, the Charité Hospital, Saint-Jean Hospital, the Saint Jacques au Bois Hospital to welcome the pilgrims, the general hospice of La Charité founded in 1752 to accommodate the elderly, beggars and the marginalised.

After World War II, the construction of a modern hospital was envisaged.

The Central Hospital of Cambrai has a capacity of 770 beds and 108 seats. It employs a staff of 150 officers and has a non-medical staff of 1,200. Three annex buildings are reserved for medium and long stay, maternity (1982) and Psychiatry (1983–1884) patients. A Nursing Training Institute was opened in 1967.

The work for the construction of the present site began in 1959, the installation of the patients being carried out between 1966 and 1968. In 2007, the work to modernise and expand the central hospital was undertaken.

The 2010 prize list of "the safest hospitals" places the Central Hospital of Cambrai as the 11th best in the national ranking.

Cambrai has three private clinics: The Sainte-Marie Clinic, Saint-Roch clinic and the Cambrésis Clinic.

== Economy ==
Cambrai is the seat of the Chamber of Commerce and Industry of the Cambrésis. In April 2007, it decided to merge with the Chamber of Commerce and Industry of Arras, a decision which was called into question on 4 October 2007, by the Ministry of Supervision of the Chambers of Commerce and Industry.

As a result of the planned closure in 2012 Airbase 103 of Cambrai-Epinoy, Cambrai and Cambrésis are classified from 1 January 2010 and until 31 December 2012 in the free zone "Zone of Defence Restructuring", allowing enterprises to create, settle or develop tax and social security exemptions.

=== Economic history ===
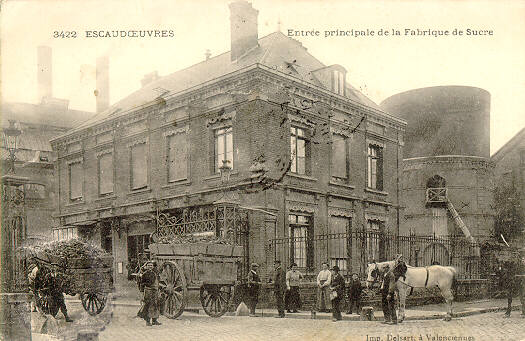
An example of the development of the food industry in the nineteenth century, the Escaudœuvres sugar factory, deemed the largest in Europe

As early as the Middle Ages, Cambrai was both an agricultural market for its region, which produces mainly cereals and wool, and a centre of weaving (sheets, woad, cloth, linen, chiffon). This dual role would persist for a long time. The drapery declined at the end of the 13th century but it was replaced by batiste, a speciality of the city, which experienced its greatest trend in the 17th century. (Note: p.137) Production declined, in turn, in the following century, but in 1775 there were still 58,000 pieces of batiste marked to Cambrai. (Note: p.161)

Economic activity declined under the First Empire due to the wars and the British blockade. In the 19th century, the textile industry remained as the dominant activity of the city, with 2,546 workers, men, women and children, in 1848. (Note: p.222) Batiste made the bulk of Cambrai's trade with other productions such as soap and refined sea salt. The food industry grew: Brasserie, chicory; the Bêtise de Cambrai was invented in 1850.

In the 19th century, the city was industrialised, especially when compared to its neighbours. Municipal officials often refused the installation of new factories, on behalf of sanitation or lack of space. The Sucrerie centrale de Cambrai was created in 1872, by Jules Linard on the territory of the town of Escaudœuvres. However, according to the census of 1886, industry was supporting more than 9,000 people, while agriculture used only 2,000 at most. The city mainly developed its commercial function: At the beginning of the 20th century the branch of the Bank of France from Cambrai ranked 12th in France, before Nice and Toulouse. (Note: p.244)

=== Business and shops ===
There are four zones and parks of activity in the agglomeration:

- The industrial zone of Cantimpré, to the south-west of the city.
- The Actipole Park, on the edge of the A2 autoroute 2 kilometres (1.2 mi) west of Cambrai, offers a total area of 97 hectares (240 acres). As it is completely occupied, it is being extended.
- The zone of Fontaine-Notre-Dame, a kilometre from the A26 autoroute, offers a total area of 75 hectares (190 acres).
- The zone of South Cambrai Proville, one kilometre to the south of Cambrai, on the RN 44, in the direction of Saint-Quentin, is devoted to the commercial areas over an area of 40 hectares (99 acres).

The economy of Cambrai is based on four pillars:

- Agriculture, which occupies a third of the territory of the commune.
- The agri-food industry, which occupies an important place in the economy of the commune (confectionery, candy, dairy, etc.) due to strong agricultural activity (intensive farming of livestock and cereals) in the arrondissement (80% of the area).
- Logistics, benefitting from the situation of the commune of Cambrai in the heart of the triangle London–Paris–Benelux and the intersection of two motorways, tends to be concentrated in the western part of the agglomeration. Thus all of the 97 hectares (240 acres) of the Actipôle Raillencourt zone of activity located 2 kilometres (1.2 mi) west of Cambrai on the edge of the A2 autoroute are now used, partly by distribution undertakings, for a thousand jobs around. The extensions Actipole 2 and 3 are underway or study.
- Textile, found predominantly in the rest of the arrondissement (Caudry, Villers-Outréaux, etc.) is represented in Cambrai by clothing and linens. The Cambrai region is associated with those of Calais and the Métropole Européenne de Lille within the Up-Tex competitiveness cluster, specialised in textile products high performance and customisation.

The Central Hospital of Cambrai, the commune of Cambrai, Auchan, Les Papillons blancs, Cora, TANIS (chemistry, rubber, plastic), the Compagnie des Engrenages et Réducteurs Messiaen Durand (mechanical equipment) and the departmental fire and rescue service were, in order, the eight major employers in the town, in 2008.

=== Perspectives ===
The future Seine-Scheldt link, the commissioning of which is scheduled for 2016, is a projected component of economic development for the city and the area of Cambrai. The multimodal platform of activities of Marquion, located 10 kilometres (6.2 mi) west of Cambrai and covering an area of 156 hectares (390 acres), is intended to accommodate European logistics and distribution centres as well as agro-food industries.

=== Income of the population and taxation ===
In 2009, the median taxable household income was €15,302, which ranks Cambrai at 25,917th place among the 31,604 communes with more than 50 households in metropolitan France.

In 2008, 263 Cambrai tax households performed the solidarity tax on wealth, for a mean wealth of €1.665 million and an average tax amount of €5,017.

=== Employment ===
According to the results of the 2017 Census, the economically active population aged 15 and over of the commune included 14,454 people, 24.3% were unemployed (France: 13.9%).

The distribution of jobs by sector of activity shows the predominant weight (almost 90%) of the tertiary sector. This distribution reflects the role which the administrative and commercial centre plays in the commune for the surrounding countryside.

Distribution of jobs by fields of activity (end of 2015)
Domain	Agriculture	Industry	Construction	Commerce	Services
Cambrai	0.1%	6.6%	3.7%	36.0%	53.7%
National average	1.1%	13.9%	6.0%	46.5%	32.5%

The distribution of jobs by socio-professional categories shows under-representation of "executives and intellectual professions", and "farmers", as well as an over-representation of the "intermediary professions" and "employees".

Distribution of employment by socio-professional categories (2017 Census)
Category	Farmers	Artisans, merchants, business leaders	Executives, intellectual professions	Intermediate professions	Employees	Workers
Cambrai	0.2%	4.6%	10.0%	22.8%	30.2%	28.3%
National average	1.3%	6.0%	16.2%	24.8%	28.5%	21.5%

The journeys to work are mostly by car (75.9%, France 70.5%) and one can note the low weight of public transport (5.8% against an average of 15.1% in France).

== Culture and heritage ==
=== Cultural events and festivities ===
On 15 August is the communal festival of Cambrai, and one of the highlights of the popular local life. This great festival (or Ducasse) extends for ten days in the Place de l'Hôtel de ville [City Hall Square]. The day of 15 August is punctuated by the traditional parade of the giants Martin and Martine, symbols of the city, and a fireworks display. This festival, originally a procession which took place the day after Trinity Sunday, dates back to 1220. It was embellished over time with fireworks, banquets and cavalcades, and was regarded as one of the seven wonders of the Cambrésis. Over the centuries the festival has changed, reflecting the concerns of the contemporary: Since attachment to France it has been celebrated on 15 August, festival of the Assumption, in response to the wish of Louis XIII to devote the Kingdom to the Virgin; in 1790 it celebrated the Declaration of the Rights of Man and the Fête de la Fédération; in 1802, with the signature of the concordat, the image of Our Lady of Grace was again carried in procession, reinforced by the bust of Fénelon. Under the First Empire it celebrated his Imperial Majesty Napoleon. In the 19th century, finally, interests turned more to local life, and the progress of science and industry. (Note: p.196)

Musically, the town of Cambrai receives two festivals. Firstly, the Juventus classical music festival. The Juventus association mark young talented European soloists. They are appointed, if they accept it, "Juventus Winners" during their first participation in a Juventus festival. Every summer the old and the new winners gather for a fortnight at the festival to prepare chamber music concerts in exceptional conditions. Juventus, established in 1991 at the Royal Saltworks at Arc-et-Senans, was set at Cambrai from 1998 with the help of the General Council of the department. Meanwhile, BetiZFest is an alternative music festival, which has been organised since 2003. It is organised during the month of April. Les Féodales is a street show which represents the Middle Ages. The last edition took place in 2008.

The Cambrai city hall is the national headquarters of the Union for the horse breed of the "Trait du Nord". The Trait du Nord national competition is traditionally held during the last weekend of July at the Palais des Grottes. Bringing together the elite of the breed, it ends on Sunday afternoon on the Place de l'hôtel de Ville with a grand parade, the most important festive presentation in France of a breed of draft horses.

=== Media ===
The La Voix du Nord regional daily publishes a local edition. The L'Observateur du Cambrésis is a weekly local news and announcements. The municipal newspaper Le Cambrésien is distributed in all the mailboxes of the city.

Cambrai is part of the territory served by radio BLC, a community radio station whose programmes are broadcast from Caudry. The inhabitants of Cambrai also have, in addition to some national radio stations, the programmes of France Bleu Nord, Chérie FM Cambrai and RFM Nord.

The city is covered by the programmes of France 3 Nord and the national DTT channels. It also received the regional channel of Wéo. Oxygen TV is a web TV channel "100% of Cambrai" devoted to local information.

=== Religion ===
The people of Cambrai have places of Catholic, Protestant and Muslim worship.

Cambrai is the seat of a Catholic archbishopric, suffragan of Lille since 29 March 2008. Until then, it was the opposite situation with the Archdiocese of Cambrai as the metropolitan archdiocese and Lille and Arras as its suffragans. The Archdiocese of Cambrai includes the arrondissements of Cambrai, Valenciennes and Avesnes-sur-Helpe. The deanery of Cambrai brings together 13 churches grouped into two parishes: Our Lady of Grace and Saint Vaast-Saint Géry.

The Baptist community has an Evangelical Baptist Church, just as there is a parish of the Reformed Church of France.

The Moroccan cultural and religious association of Cambrai manages the Al Mohssinine Mosque of Escaudain.

=== Sports ===
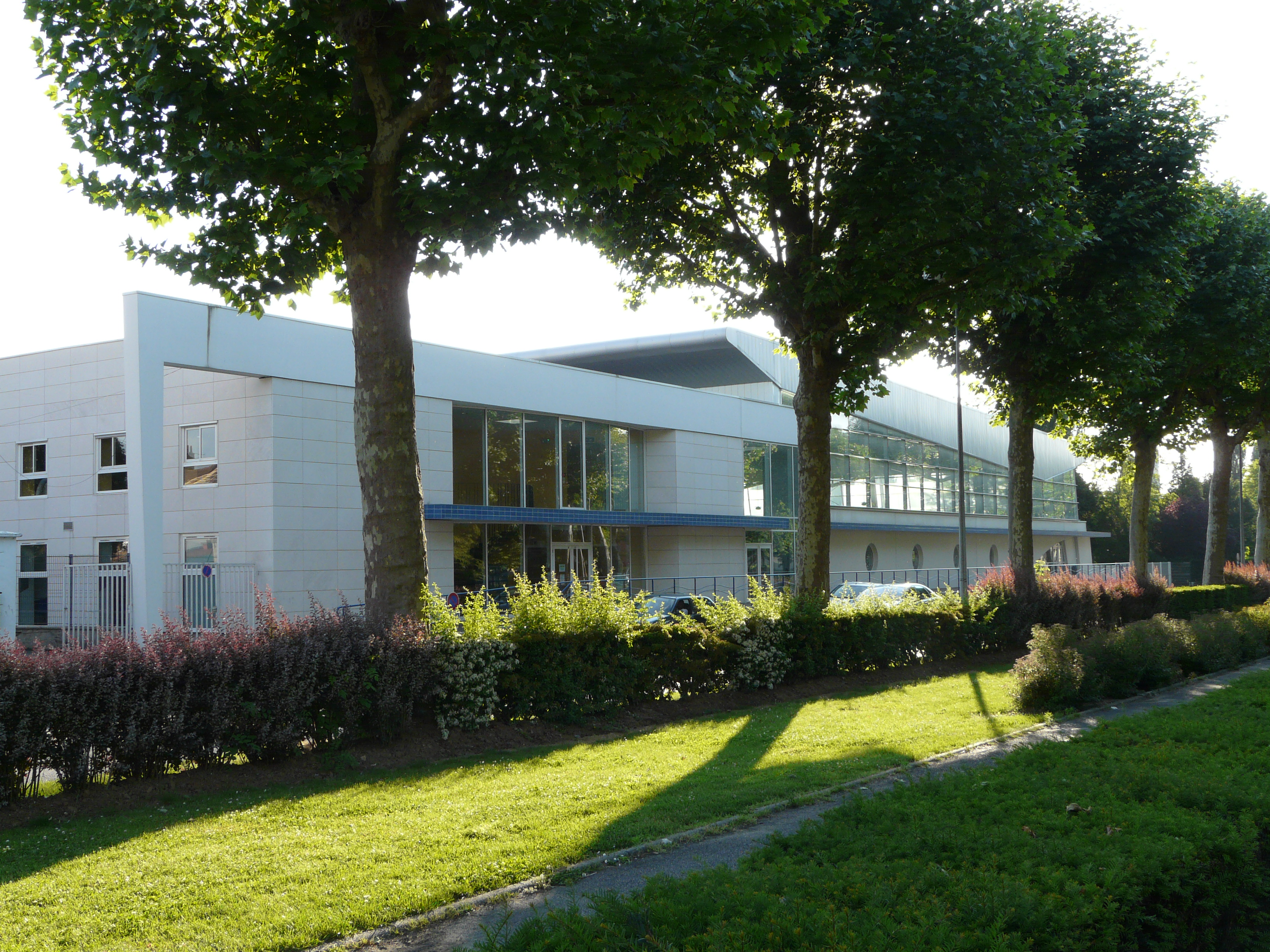
The Liberté Swimming Centre

Cambrai has over a hundred clubs or sporting associations, including the Cambrai Hockey Club playing in the Women's field hockey Championship of France, as well as the team of Cambrai Volley Élan du Cambrésis which plays in the League (2nd division) and is the only professional club of le Cambrésis.

Facilities include six gymnasiums, two swimming pools, of which the Liberty Swimming Centre was rebuilt and reopened in 2008, the Arsenal de Balagny, which was built between 1581 and 1595, abandoned by the army in 1967 and then rehabilitated as a gym, a leisure centre, a hockey stadium, a rugby stadium and many football pitches, including the Liberty Stadium, home of AC Cambrai.

Cambrai has a rowing club that goes under the name of Union Nautique de Cambrai. The club is regularly present to the Rowing French Championships. In the early 2000s, one of its feminine team members made it to the World Championships. Since then, the club has been in the phase of beginning a new cycle based on renewed team members, especially youngsters. Every year, the club is home to the Regattas of Cambrai, during which clubs from Northern France gather for sprint-races on a 1000m distance.

The game of billon is practiced traditionally in regions of Cambrai and Douai.

Cambrai was the departure point for Stage 4 of the 2004 Tour de France and once again the departure point of Stage 4 in the 2010 Tour de France. Cambrai hosted the finish of Stage 4 in the 2015 Tour de France, on 7 July, with a route from Seraing.

In 2010, the newspaper L'Équipe ranked Cambrai among the top five cities as the most sporty in France with more than 20,000 inhabitants, along with Lorient, Colmar, Antibes and Tarbes. The special prize of "Sport and Disability" was awarded to the city for its access to sport for people with disabilities.

=== French sartorial heritage ===
The city was a pivotal center of mulquinerie.

=== Sites and monuments ===
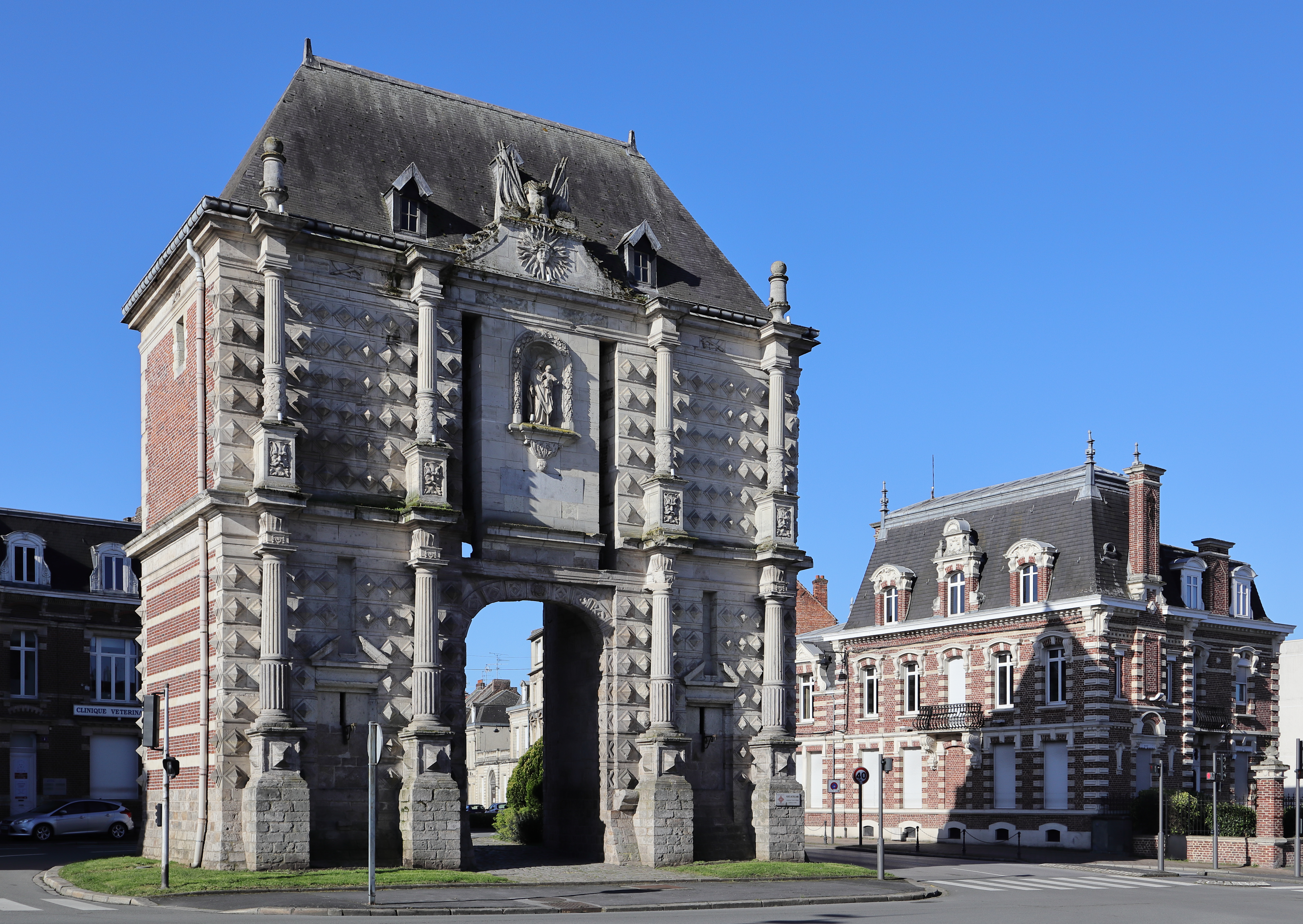
The Notre-Dame Gate (1623)

A large part of the monumental heritage of Cambrai has disappeared over the centuries. It was firstly Charles V, in order to build a citadel at the Mont-des-Bœufs, who ordered the destruction of the Abbey Saint-Gery of Gothic style in 1543.

During the French Revolution all of the religious buildings of the town were sold as national property and destroyed, including the old cathedral. Only four churches, a converted attic, a hospital, a temple of reason and a prison, were spared.

The dismantling of the fortifications, from 1894, led to the disappearance of many gates. Some have been preserved thanks to the interventions of the Society of Emulation of the city.

World War I was again responsible for significant destruction, the German army having undermined and torched the city centre before retreating in September 1918. A total of 1,214 buildings were destroyed, including the city hall, which was rebuilt in the neoclassical style before the Revolution by the architects Jacques Denis Antoine and Nicolas-Henri Jardin. (Note: p.208)

Finally at the end of World War II, in April 1944, and then again in May, July and until 11 August, Cambrai suffered Allied bombardments. A total of 55% of the buildings were heavily damaged and 13% were completely destroyed.

Despite this considerable destruction, the city kept an important monumental heritage. Cambrai has been classified as a City of Art and History since 1992, the first town of the Nord department to obtain this prestigious label.

==== Religious heritage ====
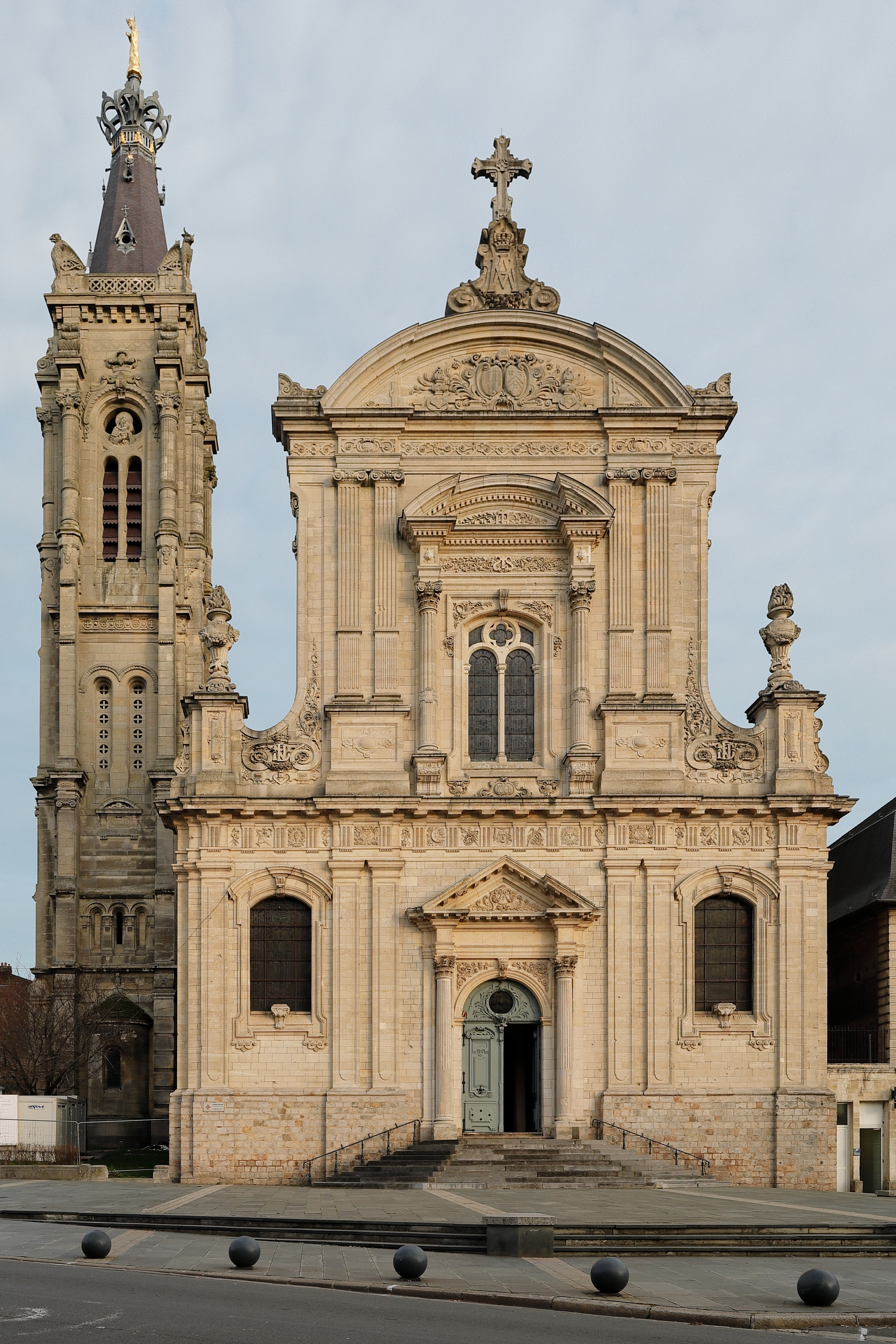
The Cathedral of Our Lady

The Our Lady of Grace Cathedral was completed in 1703, in the classical style of the time, as the abbey church of the Holy Sepulchre. The church survived the turbulence of the French Revolution as a Temple of Reason from 1794. The admirable Gothic Cathedral from the 12th century was destroyed in the aftermath the Revolution of 1789. There is no trace on the present Place Fénelon of the former building. Bishop Louis Belmas adopted the former abbey church as the new cathedral in 1801.

The apse contains the monumental tomb of Fénelon, a masterpiece of the sculptor David d'Angers, and the semitransepts with l'Icône Notre Dame de Grâce [the Icon of Our Lady of Grace] and the nine reputed grisailles by Geeraerts of Antwerp. The grand organs were built by the house of Pierre Schyven of Ixelles in 1897. After the events of World War I, extensive restoration was undertaken by the organ builder Auguste Convers, who brought the current instrument to 49 stops with 3,670 pipes. The building was classified in the inventory of Historic Monuments on 9 August 1906.

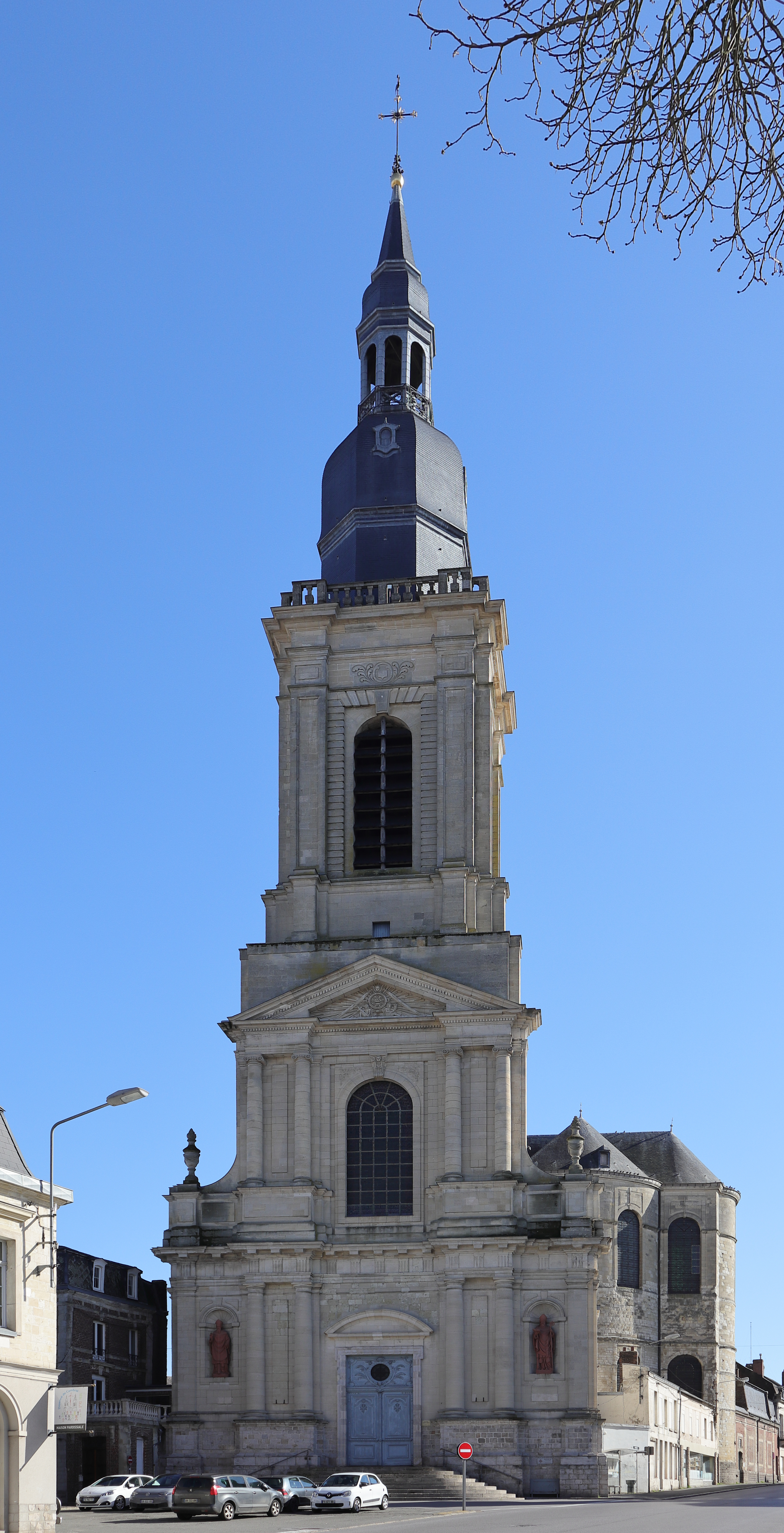
Saint-Géry

The Grand Seminary Chapel most commonly called the College of the Jesuits' Chapel, completed in 1692, is a unique example of Baroque art in France, to the north of Paris. The chapel served as a prison to the nearby Revolutionary Court in 1794, and it was classified in the inventory of Historic Monuments on 30 April 1920.

The Church of Saint-Géry, a listed historical monument since 26 November 1919, is one of the oldest monuments of Cambrai. It contains a remarkable choir screen in polychromatic marble carved by the Cambrai native Gaspard Marsy as well as La mise au tombeauu by Peter Paul Rubens dating from 1616. The grand organs built in 1867 by Merklin were the subject of a significant transformation in 1978. The current instrument has 41 stops. This church has been the subject of a restoration of the frontage and roofing over a period of four years (2011–2015).

Other buildings of Cambrai are also classified or listed as Historic Monuments. The former Convent of the Recollects has been registered since 2 March 1943, and the Béguinages Saint-Vaast and Saint-Nicolas have been classified as Historic Monuments since 1949.

==== Military heritage ====
The Citadel: Despite its dismantling in the 19th century, the Citadel of Charles V retained the counter-mine galleries which are today buried; the Royal gate and drawbridge, classified in the inventory of historical monuments on 14 April 1932, flanked on the back of two guardhouses and an arsenal of the 16th century. Among subsequent developments, a powder magazine, housing for officers and a "bombproof" barracks of the 19th century are also noteworthy.

The Château de Selles is an old fortified château, which was built in the 11th century. Once isolated by the waters of the Scheldt, it has retained its towers and walls and especially buried ducts. The ducts include much graffiti which attests to the desperation of the prisoners, confined on the orders of the Count-Bishop.

The Portes de Paris (late 14th century), Notre Dame (17th century) and the Tours des Sottes (or Saint-Fiacre), the Caudron (1st half of the 15th century) and Arquets (16th century) are the remains of the medieval walls.

==== Civil heritage ====
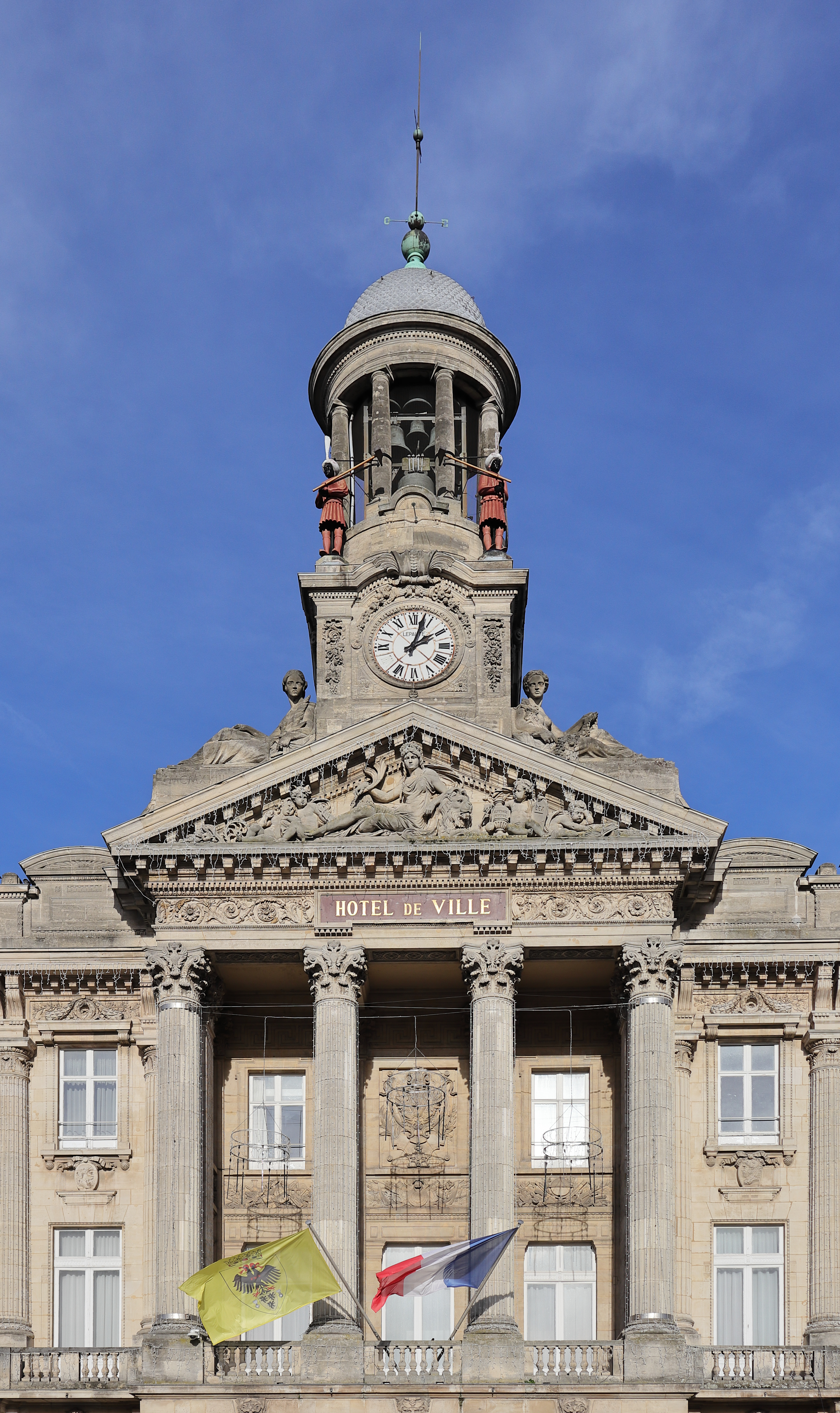
Martin and Martine strike the hours in the bell tower of the Hôtel de Ville (town hall)

The Belfry of Cambrai, formerly the bell tower of the Church of Saint-Martin. The monument, built in the 15th century, became a belfry of Cambrai in 1550. Classified in the inventory of historical monuments on 15 July 1965, in 2005 the belfry was inscribed on the UNESCO World Heritage List as part of the Belfries of Belgium and France site, in recognition of its architecture and importance to the history of municipal power in Europe.

The city hall, renovated in 1932, opens onto the Grand'Place by a majestic Greek-style façade, surmounted by a bell tower where two bronze bell ringers, giant and Moorish type, strike the hours on a big bell above the big clock: Martin and Martine, the protectors of the city. The marriage hall contains a series of frescoes and can be visited on request.

The Hotel de Francqueville (18th century) houses the rich collections of the Museum of Cambrai, considerably enlarged and renovated in 1994. The relief map of the city, as it was at the end of the 17th century, is the starting point for essential guided tours of the city.

The Maison Espagnole [Spanish House], headquarters of the Tourist Office, dates from 1595 and is the last house which is half-timbered and gabled on regional-style street. Oak sculptures (chimeras and caryatids) which adorned its façade in the 19th century are exposed on the first floor inside after undergoing a serious restoration. One can visit its medieval cellars. This building has been classified in the inventory of historical monuments on 31 August 1920.

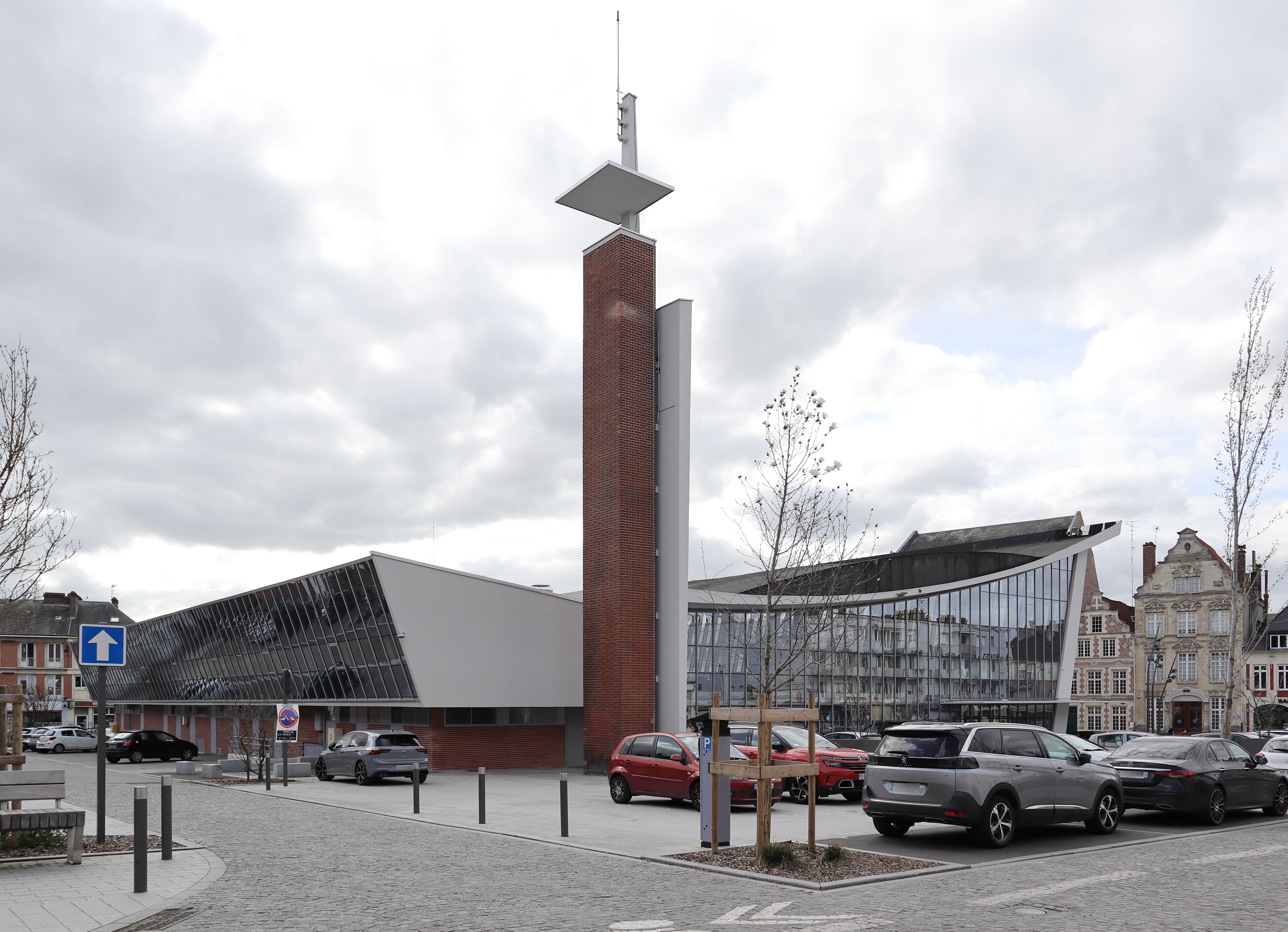
The covered market

The subterranean space which extends below the centre of the city, as in other medieval cities, was explored in the middle of the 19th century as well as to the end of the 20th century. Carved into the white chalk, it includes galleries and Romanesque and Gothic vaulted rooms. There are also wells and niches for statues. These excavations have served as quarries for the extraction of construction materials, as well as stone for lime: The "catiches" [underground quarries] are inverted funnels about 15 metres (49 ft) deep and 10–12 metres (33–39 ft) wide at the base. This underground space was also used, until 1944, for shelters and caches during sieges, invasion or bombing. Their dating is uncertain: It is not impossible that some of these excavations were carved during the Roman era, but it is likely that they were spaced out over a long period, according to the needs. Tours are organised by the tourist office.

==== Memorial heritage ====
The German military cemetery of the Route de Solesmes and Cambrai East Military Cemetery: The cemetery and the Route de Solesmes was created by the German army in March 1917. Occupied since 1914, Cambrai was an important centre of command, logistics and health for the occupant. The cemetery was opened to accommodate the bodies of soldiers who died in hospitals in the city, including at the end of the Battle of Arras (April–May 1917) and the Battle of Cambrai (November–December 1917). The cemetery currently has 10,685 German graves, as well as those of 192 Russian prisoners of war and six Romanians. Two spaces, forming the Cambrai East Military Cemetery, contain the graves of 501 soldiers of the British Imperial Army.

=== Environmental heritage ===
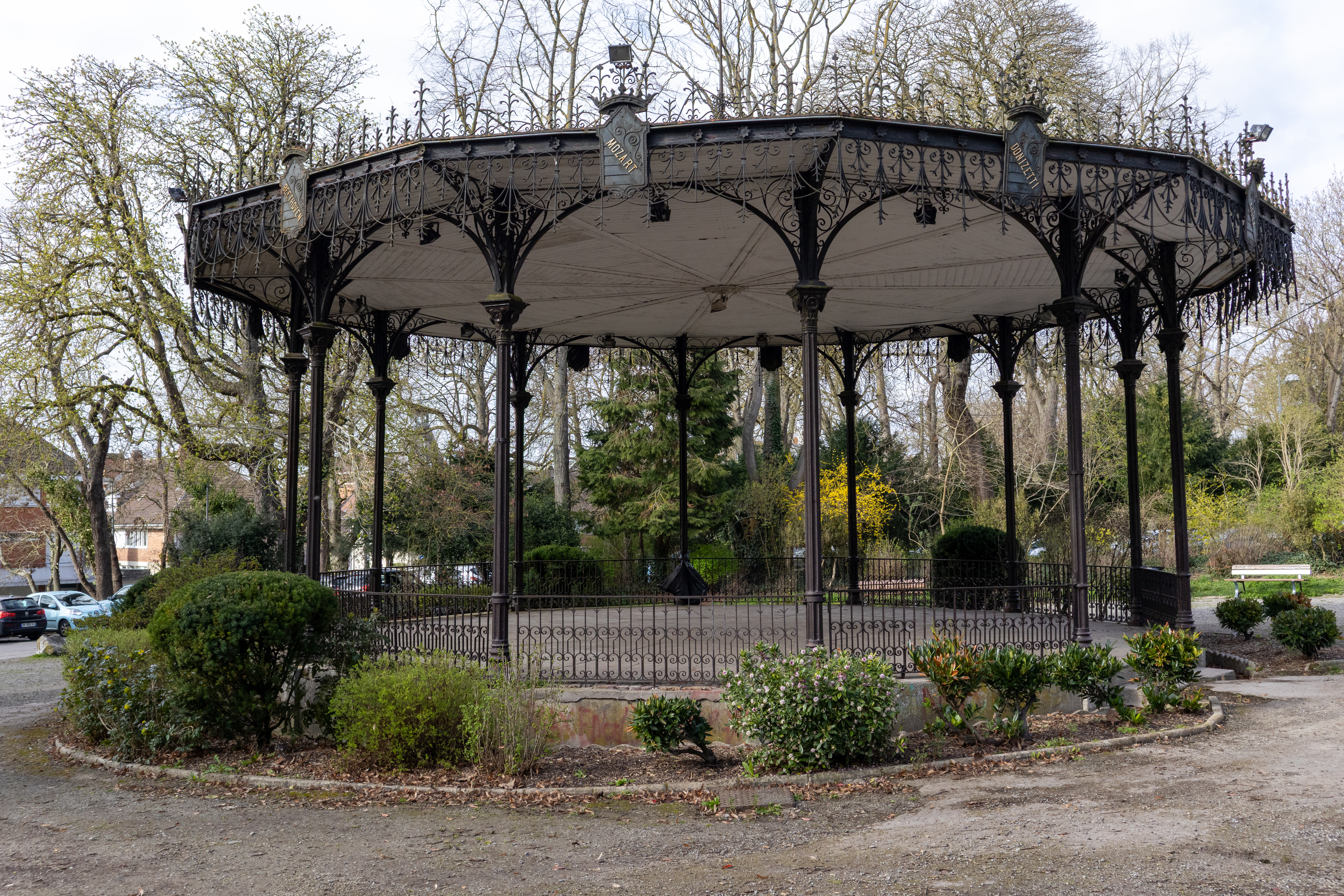
The bandstand is one of the oldest in France

Cambrai has the label "Floral City" with three flowers awarded by the National Council of Floral Cities and Villages of France in the Floral Competition of Cities and Villages.

The current public garden dates from the 19th century, which saw the creation of green spaces in the middle to encourage hygienics and which were liberated in addition to the areas occupied by the fortifications. This garden, divided into three distinct but contiguous parts, is located on the site of the old fortifications that surrounded the citadel built under Charles V:

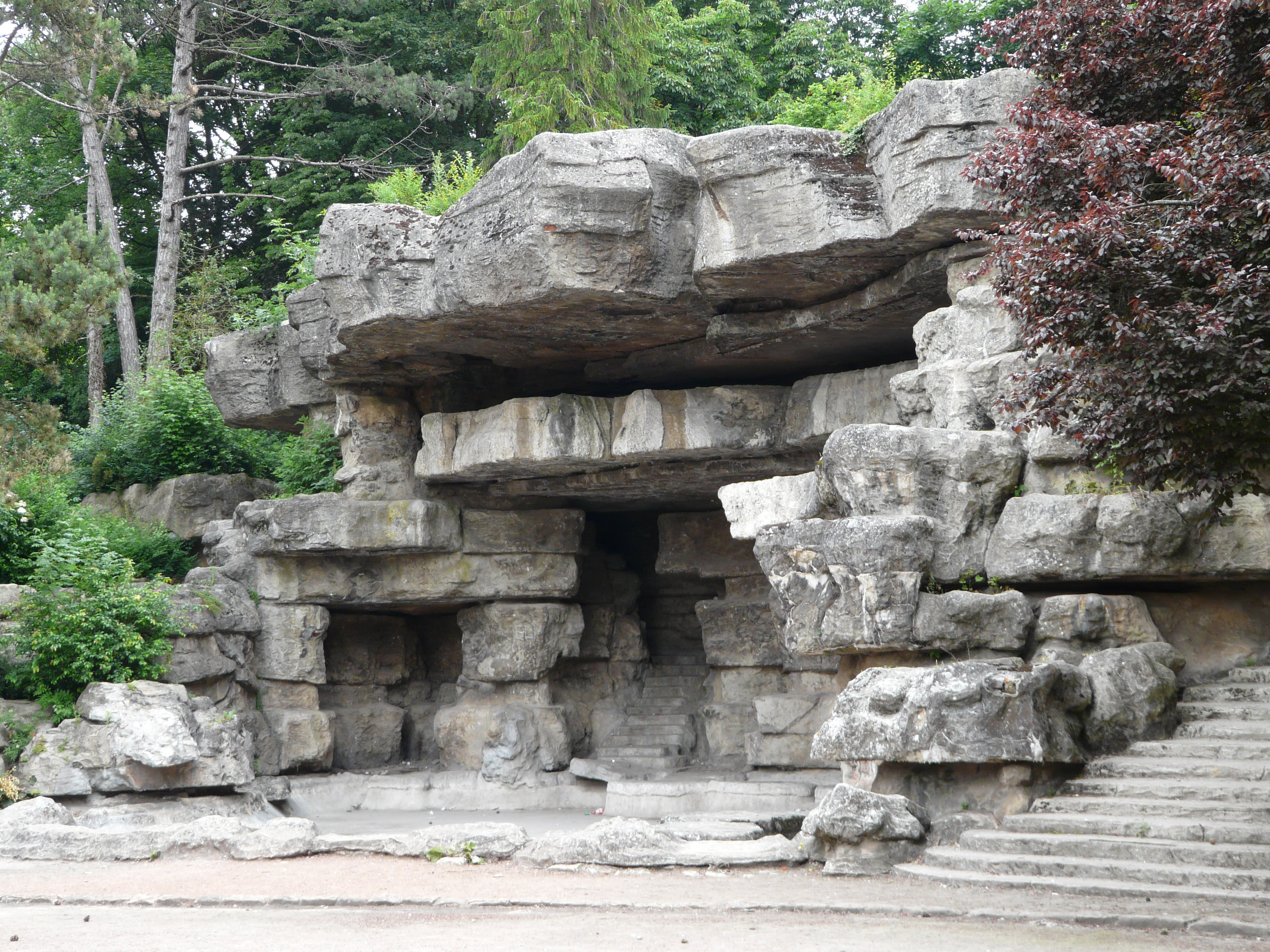
The "caves" of the public garden

- The "flower garden", designed by the landscape architect Jean-Pierre Barillet-Deschamps, was established between 1852 and 1865 on 6 hectares (15 acres). This garden was originally the only one planned but, at the insistence of the prefect of the time, it was increased to 9 hectares (22 acres) in 1864. (Note: p.198)
- The "Monstrelet Garden" designed "in English", was soon added to the previous. It is so called because it houses a statue of Enguerrand de Monstrelet, chronicler of the Middle Ages who was the Provost of Cambrai. In 1876, the bandstand was erected, built on the plans of André de Baralle.
- The "garden of caves", built in the early 19th century, carries a total area of more than 15 hectares (37 acres). The "caves", decorated with a waterfall, were the main attraction and gave their name to this part of the garden. They were completed in 1906 and in 2010 are awaiting rehabilitation.

These gardens, and in particular their statues, were damaged by the two world wars. In 1972, a modern hall, named as the Palais des Grottes [Mansion of Caves] and hosting exhibitions, trade fairs and concerts, was built in the middle of the garden of the same name.

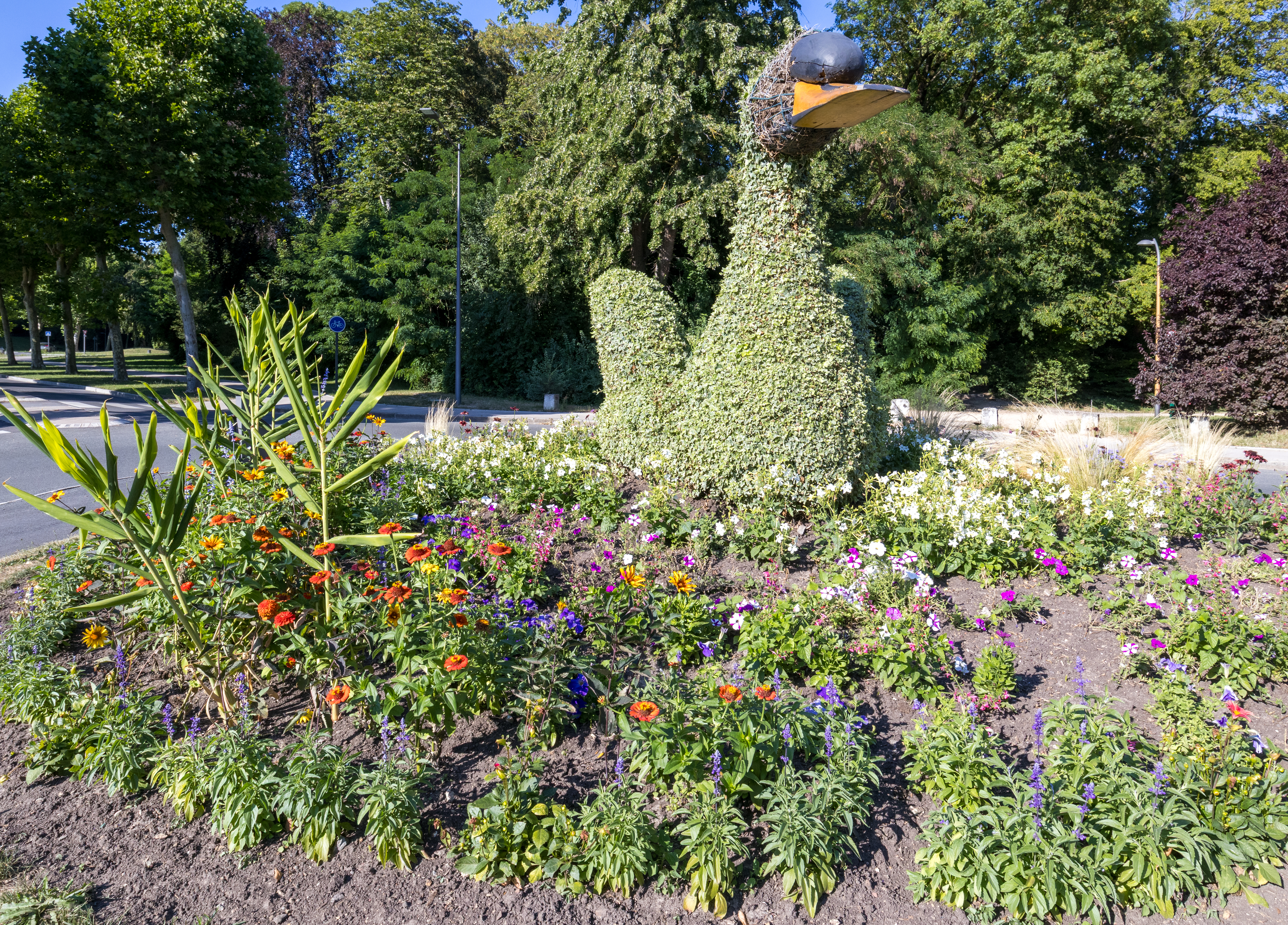
Plant swan on a roundabout

A few other squares or gardens complement the green spaces of Cambrai: Fenelon Square, established in 1861 to the designs of Barillet-Deschamps on the site of the ancient metropolis and decorated in 1864 with a water fountain, that of the Place Marcelin Berthelot, which dates from 1911. This is at the foot of the walls of the Château de Selles, dating from the same year. That beside the Arquets tower dates from 1954. (Note: p.199) The avenues and boulevards planted with trees and flowers to complete make Cambrai a "green" city.

=== Cultural heritage ===
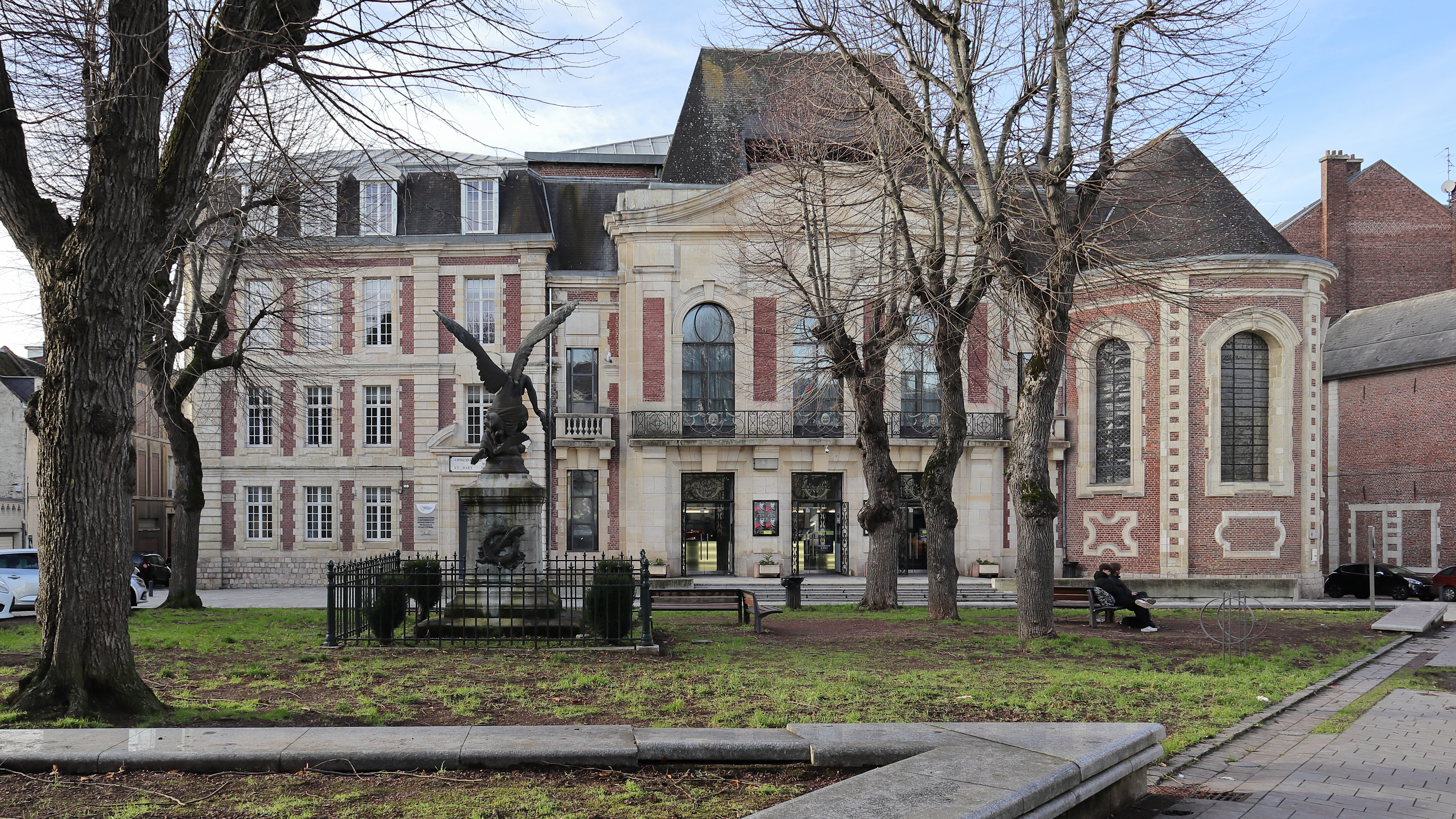
The theatre of Cambrai, between the National Conservatory of Music and Dramatic Art and the chapel of the old Saint-Julien Hospital

The Musée des Beaux-Arts de Cambrai opened in 1847 to present revolutionary seizures, has been installed since 1893 in a mansion of the 18th century, the Hotel de Francqueville. Renovated in 1994, it has three departments (archaeology, fine arts and heritage of Cambrai) on 4,300 square metres (46,000 sq ft) of which the most important is that of art. It presents Flemish and Dutch paintings from the 17th century and French artists of the 19th and 20th century. A recent donation also allowed it to present a collection of geometric abstractions of the second half of the 20th century.

The Diocesan Museum of Sacred Art still officially retains its label "Musée de France", (Note: Label renewed by Ministerial Decree of 17 September 2003) although it was closed to the public in 1975. This private museum is managed by the diocese, which is looking for ways to reopen the collections to the public. The items of this collection may be the subject of loans for temporary exhibitions and include objects from the archaeological excavations of the city of Cambrai, architectural elements, sculpture, paintings, pieces of jewellery and liturgical ornaments. This museum's history began in 1926 when Monseignor Chollet, Archbishop of Cambrai, established a commission of religious history and sacred art aimed to inventory and preserve the archives and movable heritage of the diocese. Canon Cyrille Thelliez became secretary. In 1958, many religious objects from the diocese were gathered together and Thelliez founded the Diocesan Museum, the first religious art museum opened in France. The museum was installed in the former chapel of the Grand Seminary.

The Théâtre de Cambrai was built in 1924 by the architect Pierre Leprince-Ringuet, on the site of a chapel of the 16th century which was destroyed during World War I. The chapel had been abandoned for 25 years when its rehabilitation was undertaken in 1999. The renovated theatre was inaugurated in 2003. It is an Italian theatre of 700 seats which hosts various performances, including those of the Scènes mitoyennes [Adjoining Stages] association and the Juventus classical music festival.

The Palais des grottes [Mansion of Caves] situated in the public garden, is a large multi-purpose hall with a capacity of 1,500 people and which can accommodate concerts, (including the BetiZFest), fairs or exhibitions. Its remarkable roof shape, formed of a hyperbolic paraboloid (or "saddle"), was built in 1974 by then-advanced techniques and demonstrates a concrete form of architecture in the 20th century. (Note: pp.216–217)

The media library is a classified municipal library: It has an important old fonds, with 956 manuscripts, the oldest dating back to the 7th century, from the confiscations made during the revolutionary era to religious communities, very important in the city, and emigrants of the region. This fonds was subsequently enriched by gifts, bequests and purchases. In 1975, it was one of the first institutions to adopt the title of "media library". It is divided into four services: Youth, adults, library and local history and old books.

Cambrai has a national school of music and dramatic arts which obtained the Conservatoire à rayonnement départemental label in 2007.

=== Culinary specialities ===
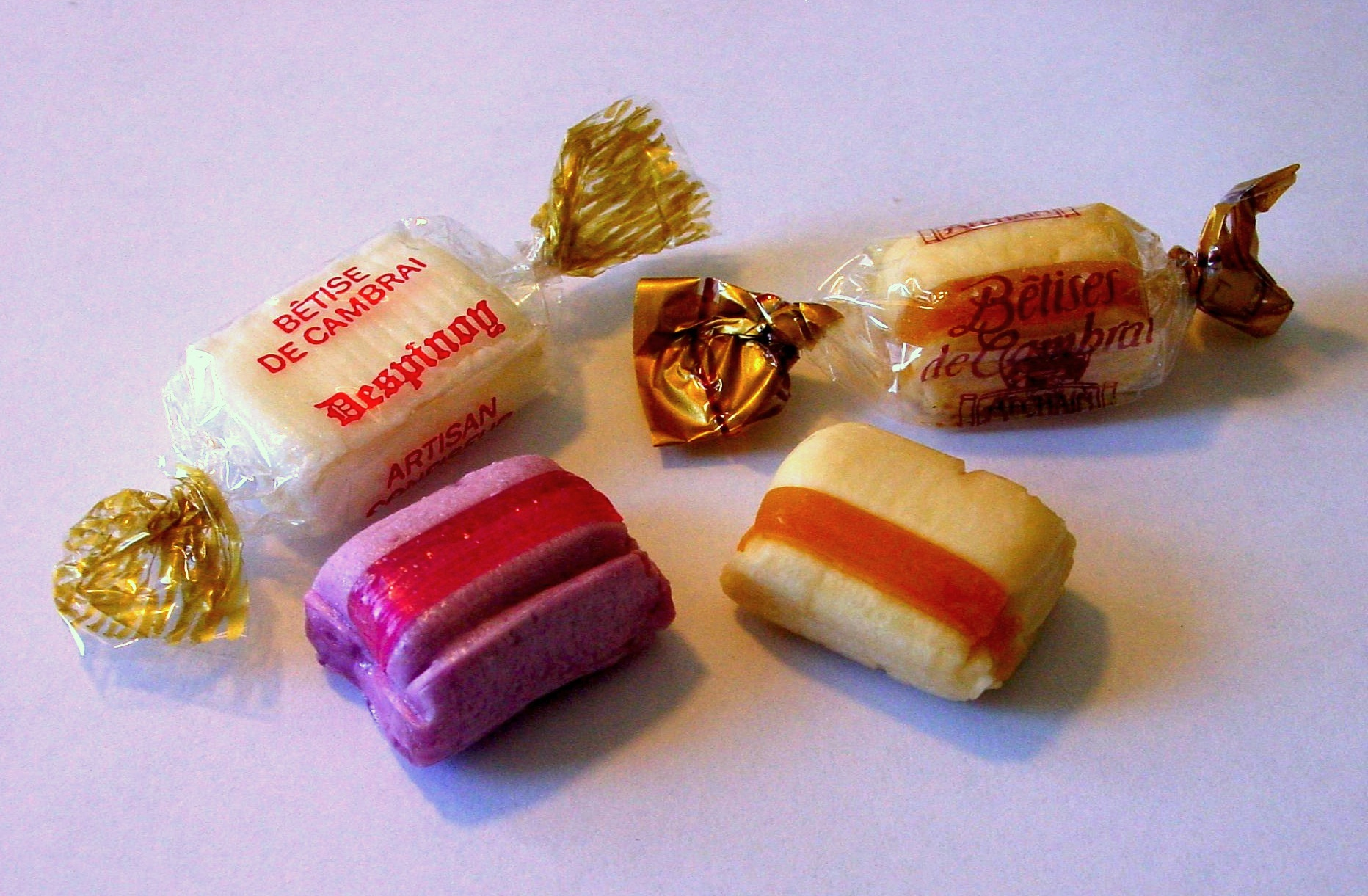
Bêtises de Cambrai

The two best-known gastronomic specialties of Cambrai are the Andouillette de Cambrai, a sausage traditionally made of ground veal (which was prohibited by European regulations, following the episode of mad cow disease, until 2015), which associated gastronomic society is one of the most representative in the region, and the Bêtise de Cambrai, a coated mint confection which is one of the most emblematic gourmet specialties of France.

The gastronomy of Cambrai also accounts for other less known specialities: Tripe, liver pâté with plums, hare with grapes, hochepot of partridge with puréed lentils, but also the Boulette de Cambrai, fromage blanc with fine herbs, and also a cheese trademarked as "Tome de Cambrai", or even crackers and pain crotté [muddy bread] (a type of French toast).

=== Heraldry, motto ===
Arms of Cambrai	The arms of Cambrai are blazoned: "Or, a double-headed eagle sable, (haloed) beaked and membered gules, overall an inescutcheon Or, 3 lions azure." The first known arms appear on a seal from 1340. They represented an eagle holding in its talons the arms of le Cambrésis, "of Or three Lion Cubs of azure". Under the Spanish domination these arms were slightly modified, the double-headed eagle of the Holy Roman Empire became an honourable figure (Note: The honourable ordinaries are large enough to be able to be 'honoured' (charged).) and arms of the Cambrésis being removed. The coat of arms thus means "Cambrai city of the empire and capital of the Cambrésis".

The eagle is usually surmounted with the ducal crown, the city having been elevated to a Duchy in 1510. In 1815 Cambrai received from Louis XVIII the right again to its ancient arms. In 1919, it was awarded the cross of the Legion of Honour, and in 1945 the Croix de Guerre. On the front of the Chamber of Commerce (shown adjoining), built after the World War I, the arms are surmounted by the Ducal Crown, framed by the giants Martin and Martine, and increased by the cross of the Legion of Honour.

The motto of the city has changed several times:

- 1579: "Cambray, city of peace."
- 1580: "Concordia parvæ res crescunt" ("Harmony makes small things grow"). This motto is the same as that of the United Provinces ("Unity makes strength")
- Current motto: "Proud of its past, sure of its future."

The logo of the city is a stylisation of the steeples of the cathedral, the Saint-Géry Church and belfry, a visual signature of the city, visible from afar. Locally, Cambrai is known as "the city of three spires".

=== Military life ===
In 1711–1712, during the War of the Spanish Succession, the regiments of Rousillon and Royal-Comtois had their barracks at Cambrai.

From the late 19th century, two military units were stationed at Cambrai. The 1st Infantry Regiment was quartered at Cambrai from 1870 to 1914, when it left for Belgium, before returning in 1919. It was split between the citadel and the Renel barracks. In 1940 it was again sent to Belgium, before being dissolved in 1942 in the free zone and did not return to Cambrai. The 4th Cuirassier Regiment arrived in Cambrai in 1889 and is the Mortier quarter. This regiment was dissolved at the end of World War I. After World War II the Mortier quarter was assigned to the Selection Centre No. 2, today disbanded.

Until 2012, the Airbase 103 "René Mouchotte" was near the city, founded in 1953 and which hosted the 01.012 Fighter Squadron "Cambrésis" created in 1952, the 02.012 "Picardy" and the 03.012 "Cornouailles" [Cornwall], as well as a ground-to-air defence squadron.

=== Cambrai in literature and cinema ===
- Ernst Jünger in Storm of Steel, dedicated to World War I, described Cambrai in 1917:

Cambrai is a small, quiet and sleepy city of Artois (sic), to the name of which is attached many historical memories. Narrow and antiquated alleys run like a maze around the huge city hall, doors eaten away by the centuries and many churches, the largest of which saw Fénelon preach. Heavy steeples stand amongst a jumble of pointed gables. Broad avenues lead to a well-kept public garden, which is adorned with a monument to Louis Blériot.

The inhabitants are peaceful and cordial people, who lead in their big houses, simple in appearance, but richly furnished, with a life of wellbeing. The small city has been rightfully nicknamed "the city of millionaires" because, just before the war, there were forty of these Croesus-like people.

The Great War tore this hole of the province in its sleep of Sleeping Beauty and the gigantic turn of home struggles...

— Ernst Jünger, Storm of Steel

- The streets of Cambrai served as a backdrop to Sang noir [Black Blood], a 90-minute fiction filmed from 7 March to 6 April 2006 through Production of France 3 Lille, based on the novel of the same name by Louis Guilloux which takes place in 1917 in a small town, far from the Western Front.
- In 2007, the construction of the bypass of Cambrai was used for the filming of the movie In the Beginning by Xavier Giannoli. Some scenes of the film Présumé coupable [Presumed Guilty], by Vincent Garenq, were shot at Cambrai in April 2010.
- The comic book Asterix and the Banquet by Goscinny and Uderzo have a journey to various cities in Roman Gaul, including Camaracum (Cambrai): Asterix and Obelix buy bêtises.
- The young-adult novel Les Bêtises de Cambrai (Airvey, 2011) by Eric Callens.

=== Cambrai and philately ===
Four postage stamps have been issued in connection with the city of Cambrai:

- 10 July 1947, a stamp commemorating Fénelon, Archbishop of Cambrai, with a face value of 4.50 Francs.
- 19 February 1972, a stamp commemorating Louis Blériot, born in Cambrai, with a face value of 0.50 Francs with surcharge: 0.10 Francs for the benefit of the French Red Cross.
- 14 May 1977, a stamp commemorating the capture of Cambrai in 1677 and the annexation of Cambrésis by France, with a face value of 0.80 Francs
- 25 July 2009, a stamp commemorating the crossing of the English channel by Louis Blériot, with a face value of €2.00.

== Notable people ==
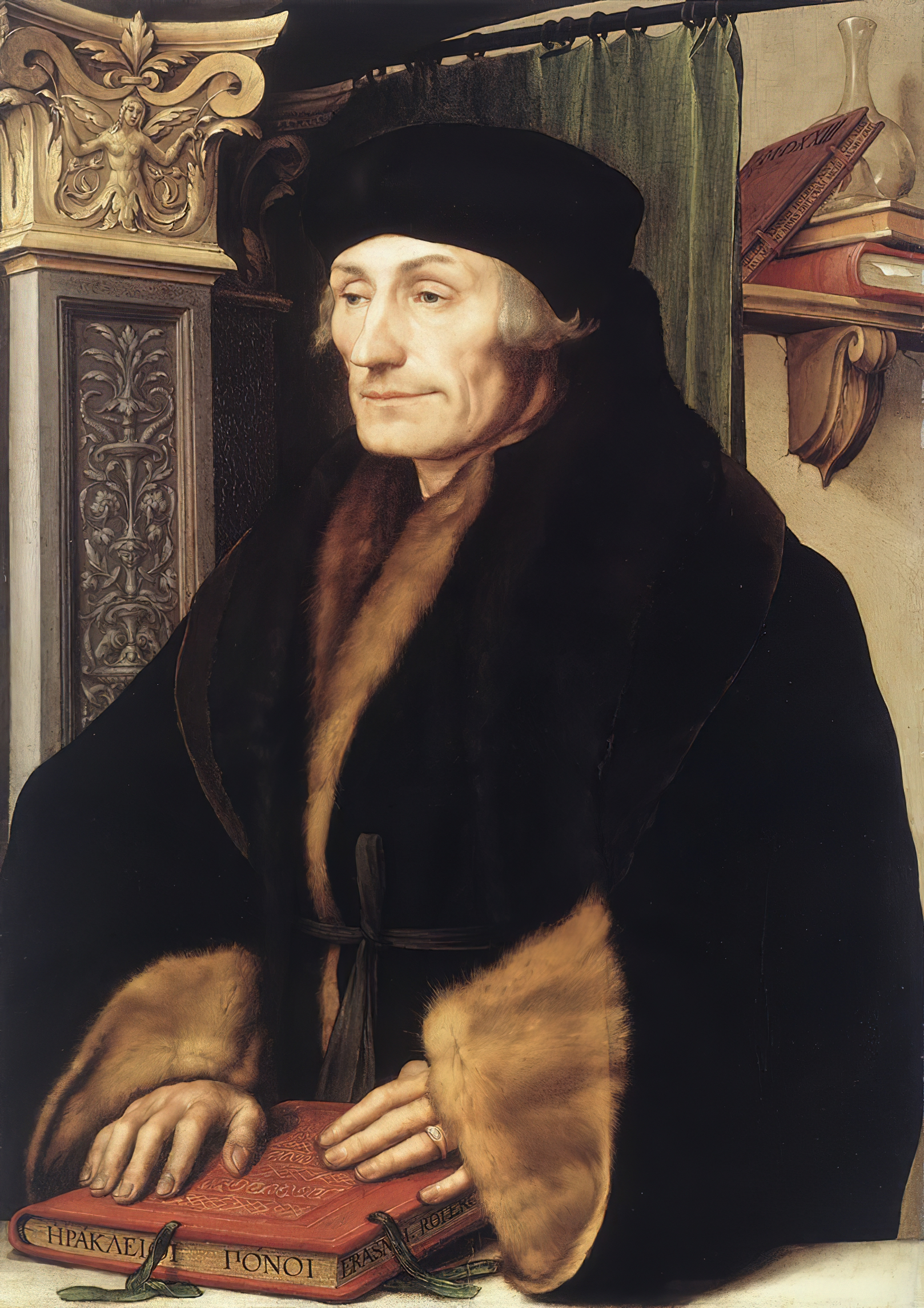
Erasmus

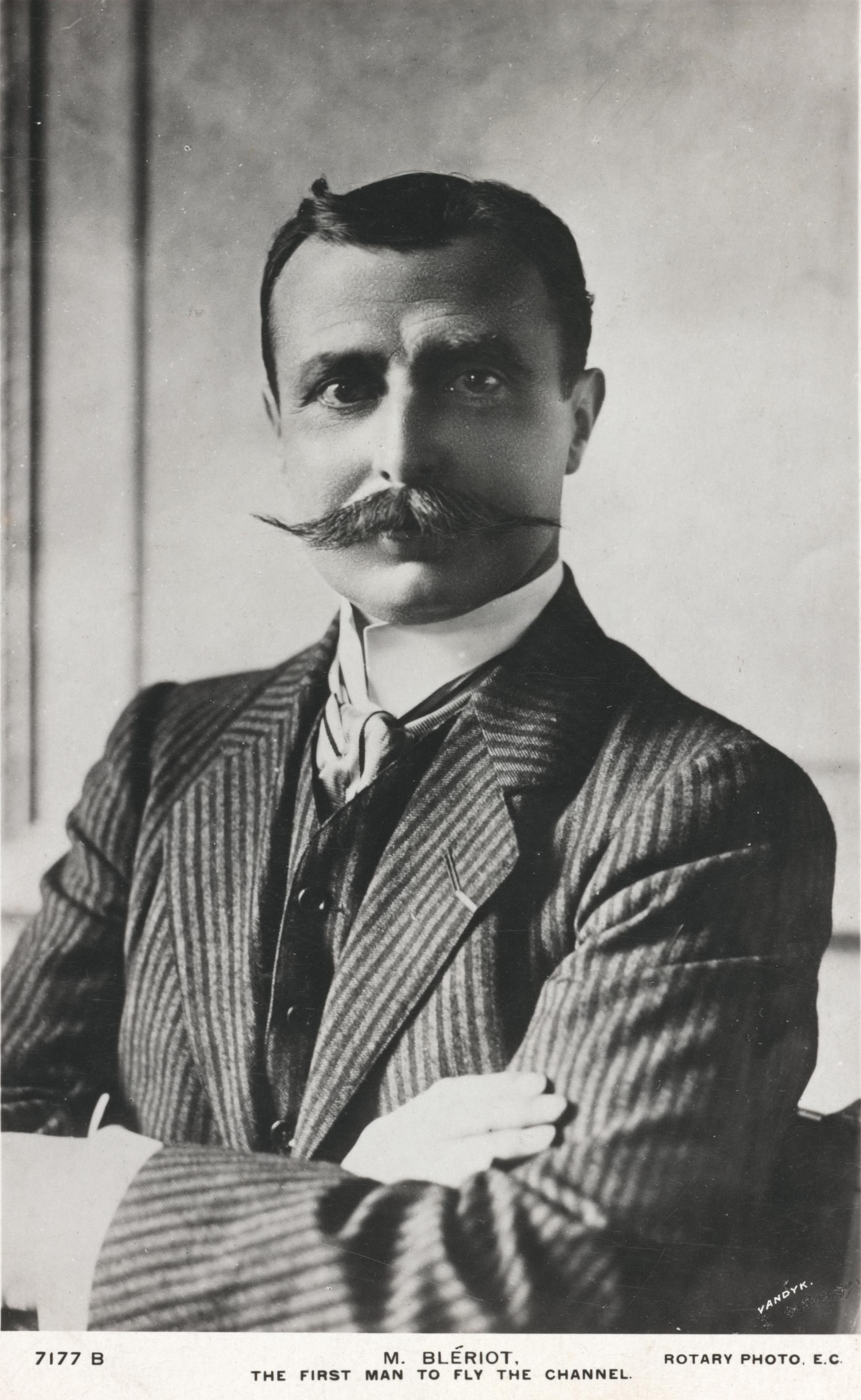
Louis Blériot

- Villard de Honnecourt, lived in Cambrai, architect of the 13th century
- Pierre d'Ailly (1351–1420), Bishop of Cambrai from 1397 to 1411
- Nicolas Grenon (c. 1375–1456), died in Cambrai, composer
- Guillaume Dufay (c. 1400–1471), died in Cambrai, composer
- Erasmus (1469–1536), appointed Secretary of the Bishop of Cambrai in 1493
- Noé Faignient (c. 1540–before 1600), born in Cambrai, composer
- Franciscus van der Burch (c. 1567–1644), named seventh Archbishop of Cambrai in 1616
- Amé Bourdon (1636 or 1638–1706), born in Cambrai, physician and anatomist
- François de Salignac de La Mothe-Fénelon (c. 1651–1715), appointed Archbishop of Cambrai in 1695
- Guillaume Dubois (c. 1656–1723), known as Cardinal Dubois. appointed Archbishop of Cambrai, though never set foot there
- Charles François Dumouriez (1739–1823), born in Cambrai, soldier and politician
- Francisco de Carondelet (1747–1807), in Noyelles, Spanish governor of Louisiana, president of the Audiencia of Quito
- Joseph Le Bon (born c. 1765–1795), envoy of the Committee of Public Safety, made the Reign of Terror in Cambrai
- Charles Defrémery (1822–1883), orientalist born in Cambrai
- Charles Cordier (1827–1905), born in Cambrai, sculptor of ethnographic subjects
- Jules Gosselet (1832–1916), born in Cambrai, French geologist
- Auguste Dorchain (1857–1930), born in Cambrai, poet
- Marcel Lermoyez (1858–1929), otologist
- Georges Maroniez (1865–1933), painter and photographer, lived in Cambrai from 1897
- Louis Blériot (1872–1936), born in Cambrai, industrialist and aviator
- Pierre Leprince-Ringuet (c. 1874–1954), architect of the reconstruction after World War II
- Henri de Lubac (1896–1991), born in Cambrai, Jesuit Catholic theologian and Bishop
- Julien Torma (1902–1933), writer, playwright and poet
- René Dumont (1904–2001), born in Cambrai, engineer in agronomy, sociologist, and founder of the political ecology
- Maurice Henry (1907–1984), born in Cambrai, poet, painter, draughtsman and French filmmaker
- Maurice Godelier (1934–), born in Cambrai, social anthropologist, neo-Marxist
- Jean-Pierre Destrumelle (1941–2002), born in Cambrai, football player and coach
- Jean Gascou (1945), papyrologist
- Marie-Georges Pascal (1946–1985), actress
- Jean-Sylvain Bieth (1955–), born in Cambrai, visual artist
- Anne Caudry (1957–1991), born in Cambrai, actress
- Sonia Dubois (1963–), born in Cambrai, journalist and actress
- Loïc Attely (1977–), born in Cambrai, fencer (foil fencer)
- Nicolas Mérindol (1961–), born in Cambrai, banker, former Chairman of the Crédit foncier of France and Chairman of the Milton group
- Jacques Édouard Quecq (1796-1874), painter

== See also ==
- Cambric
- Great Fear
- Archdiocese of Cambrai
- Marcel Gaumont. Sculpture on Chamber of Commerce and Belfry

== Sources ==
- Dauvegis, Jean (1991). La Vie des Cambrésiens. Cambrai: Les amis du Cambrésis. 327.
- Trenard, Louis; Rouche, Michel (1982). Histoire de Cambrai (24cm). Vol. 2. Presses Universitaires de Lille. ISBN 2-85939-201-7.
- Dussart, Michel (2004). Mémoire de Cambrai. Société d'Émulation de Cambrai. ISBN 2-85845-001-3.
- Revue du Nord, Louis Trenard (dir.), Université de Lille III, Villeneuve d'Ascq, Vol. LVIII no.230, Numéro spécial "Cambrai et le Cambrésis", July–September 1976

== Bibliography ==
: Document used as a source for the drafting of this article.

- David Fallows, Barbara H. Haggh: "Cambrai", Grove Music Online ed. L. Macy (Accessed 18 December 2005), (subscription access) (source for the music history section)
- Bouly, Eugène (1842). Histoire de Cambrai et du Cambrésis [History of Cambrai and of the Cambrésis] (in French). Vol. 1. Cambrai: Hattu, Libraire-Éditeur.
- Bouly, Eugène (1842). Histoire de Cambrai et du Cambrésis [History of Cambrai and of the Cambrésis] (in French). Vol. 2. Cambrai: Hattu, Libraire-Éditeur.
- Trenard, Louis; Pietri, Charles (1974). Histoire des Pays-Bas Français [History of the French Netherlands]. Histoire des Provinces (in French). Édouard Privat.
- Pierrard, Pierre (1976). La Vie quotidienne dans le Nord au XIX siecle, Artois, Flandre, Hainaut, Picardie [Daily life in Nord in the nineteenth century, Artois, Flanders, Hainaut, Picardie] (in French). Hachette. ISBN 2-01-002861-9.
- Pierrard, Pierre (1 November 1978). Histoire du Nord, Flandre, Artois, Hainaut, Picardie [History of the Nord, Flanders, Artois, Hainaut, Picardie] (in French). Hachette. ISBN 2-01-020306-2.
- Trenard, Louis; Rouche, Michel (1982). Histoire de Cambrai [History of Cambrai] (24cm) (in French). Vol. 2. Presses Universitaires de Lille. ISBN 2-85939-201-7.
- Wytteman, Jean-Pierre (1988). Le Nord, de la Préhistoire à nos jours [Nord, from prehistory to the present] (in French). Bordessoules. ISBN 2-903504-28-8.
- Dauvegis, Jean (1991). La Vie des Cambrésiens [The Lives of Cambrésiens] (in French). Cambrai: Les amis du Cambrésis.
- Dussart, Michel (2004). Mémoire de Cambrai [Memory of Cambrai] (in French). Société d'Émulation de Cambrai. ISBN 2-85845-001-3.
- Montigny, Henri; et al. (1982). Le château de Selles à Cambrai, Photographies et documentation [The Château de Selles in Cambrai, Photographs and Documentation] (in French). Centre culturel de Cambrai.
- Deniere, Jocelyne; Deniere, Lysiane (2008). Les Beffrois de Belgique et de France, inscrits au Patrimone Mondial de l'Humanité de l'Unesco [The Belfries of Belgium and France, registered in the World Heritage of Humanity of UNESCO] (in French). Éditions J. et L. Deniere. ISBN 978-2-911327-26-1.
- Trenard, Louis. Revue du Nord [Review of Nord] (in French). Vol. 58. Villeneuve d'Ascq: Université de Lille III. Special number "Cambrai et le Cambrésis", July–September 1976
- Chisholm, Hugh, ed. (1911). "Cambrai" . Encyclopædia Britannica. Vol. 5 (11th ed.). Cambridge University Press. pp. 85–86.
