= 1776 in architecture =

The year 1776 in architecture involved some significant events.

== Buildings and structures ==
=== Buildings ===
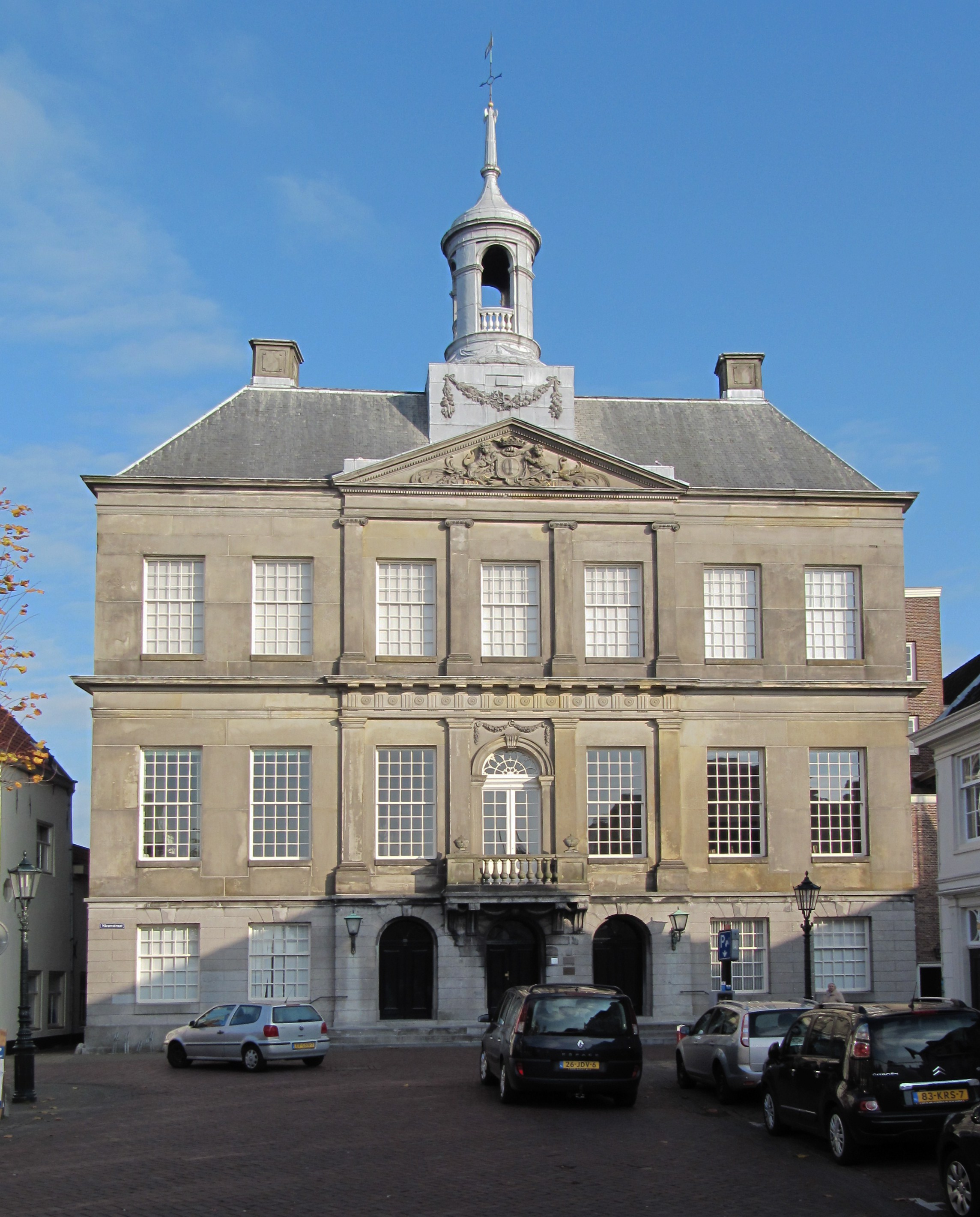
City Hall, Weesp

- The Landhaus (Dresden), designed by Friedrich August Krubsacius, is completed.
- City Hall, Weesp in the Netherlands, designed by Jacob Otten Husly with Leendert Viervant the Younger, is completed.
- Rauma Old Town Hall in Finland, designed by Christian Friedrich Schröder, is built.
- Hôtel du Châtelet town house in Paris, designed by Mathurin Cherpitel, is built.
- Château Malou near Brussels in the Austrian Netherlands is built.
- Curtea Nouă palace in Bucharest, Principality of Wallachia, is completed.
- New Wardour Castle in Wiltshire, England, designed by James Paine, is built to replace the ruined Wardour Castle.
- Woolverstone Hall in Suffolk, England, designed by John Johnson, is built.
- The Wenyuan Chamber, an imperial library in the Forbidden City of Beijing, is built.
- The Palazzi di S. Apollinare in Rome is extended by Pietro Camporese il Vecchio and Pasquale Belli.
- The church of San Barnaba, Venice, is reconstructed by Lorenzo Boschetti.
- The Villa del Poggio Imperiale near Florence in Tuscany is remodelled by Gaspare Paoletti.
- 11–15 Portman Square, London, designed by James Wyatt, are completed.
- The Dobbin House Tavern in Gettysburg, Pennsylvania, is built and is later used as a home on the Underground Railroad.
- New Aray Bridge on Inveraray Castle estate in Scotland, designed by Robert Mylne, is completed.

== Births ==
- June 8 – Thomas Rickman, English architect and architectural antiquary (died 1841)
- June 11 – James Gillespie Graham, Scottish architect (died 1855)
- August 22 – Carlo Amati, Italian architect (died 1852)

== Deaths ==
- June 4 – Johann Gottfried Rosenberg, German-Danish rococo architect (born 1709)
