= 1810 in architecture =

The year 1810 in architecture involved some significant architectural events and new buildings.

== Buildings and structures ==
=== Buildings opened ===
- February 10 – Odessa Opera and Ballet Theater, Ukraine, designed by Jean-François Thomas de Thomon, opened.
- November 30 – St. Andrew's Presbyterian Church, Quebec City, Canada inaugurated.

=== Buildings completed ===
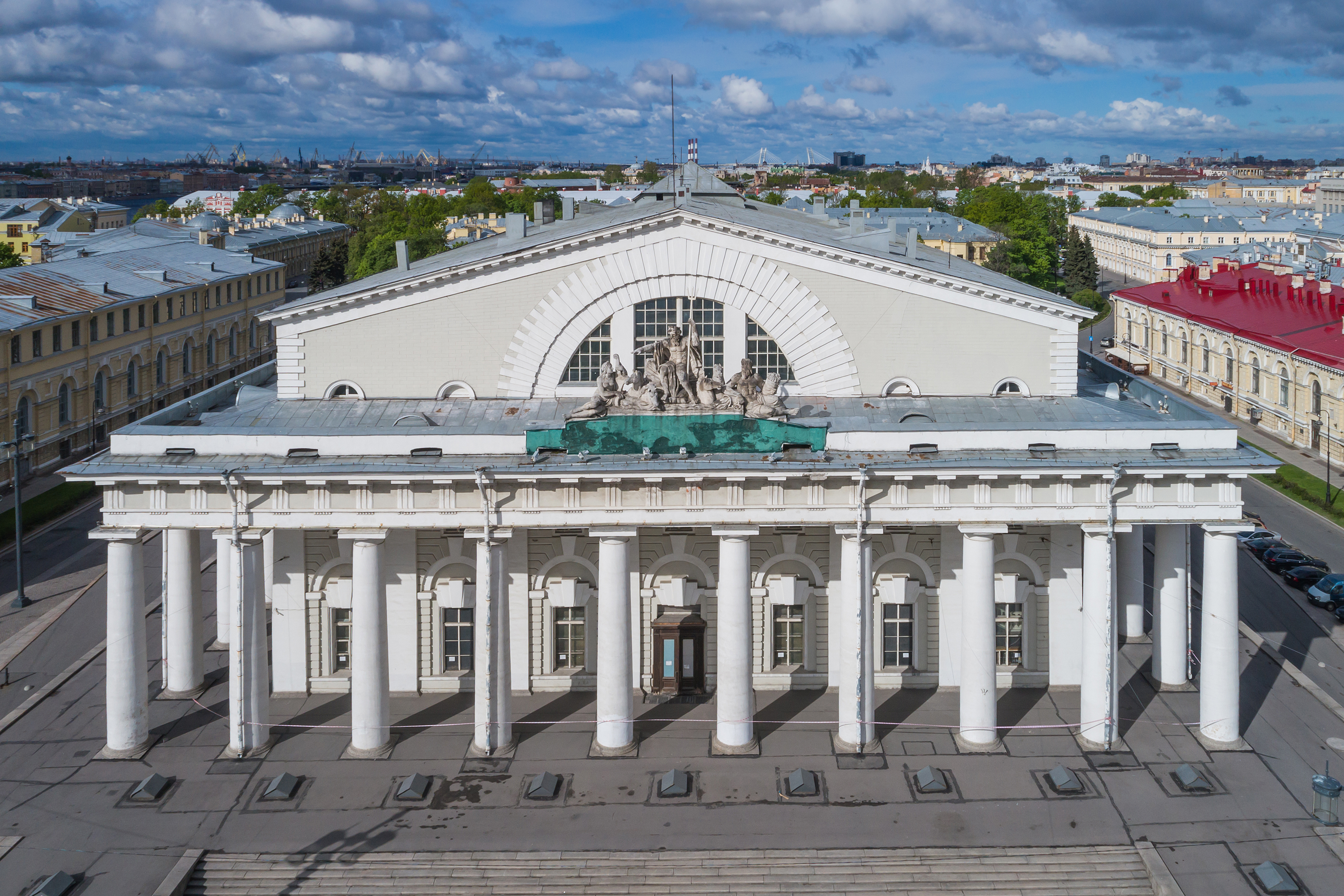
Old Saint Petersburg Stock Exchange

- St. George Orthodox Church, Chandanapally, India (original building).
- Basílica del Santísimo Sacramento, Colonia del Sacramento, Uruguay, designed by Tomás Toribio.
- Old Saint Petersburg Stock Exchange, Russia, designed by Jean-François Thomas de Thomon, completed.
- Commercial Rooms, Bristol, England, designed by Charles Busby.
- City hall, Groningen, Netherlands, designed by Jacob Otten Husly in 1775, completed.
- Northgate, Chester, England, designed by Thomas Harrison.
- Old Market, Dominica.
- Gignac Bridge, France, designed by Bertrand Garipuy in 1776, completed by Billoin and Fontenay.

== Events ==
- Rebuilding of the Church of the Holy Sepulchre in Jerusalem.

== Births ==
- June 19 – Charles Wilson, Scottish neoclassical architect (died 1863)
- February 24 – William Mason, English-born New Zealand architect (died 1897)
- April 1 – Benjamin Ferrey, English architect (died 1880)
- date unknown – John Notman, Scottish-born American architect (died 1865)

== Deaths ==
- January 19 – Jan Ferdynand Nax, Polish architect, economist and social reformer (born 1736)
- January 23 – Francesco Piranesi, Italian engraver, etcher and architect (born 1756 or 1758)
