= 1775 in architecture =

The year 1775 in architecture involved some significant events.

== Buildings and structures ==
=== Buildings ===
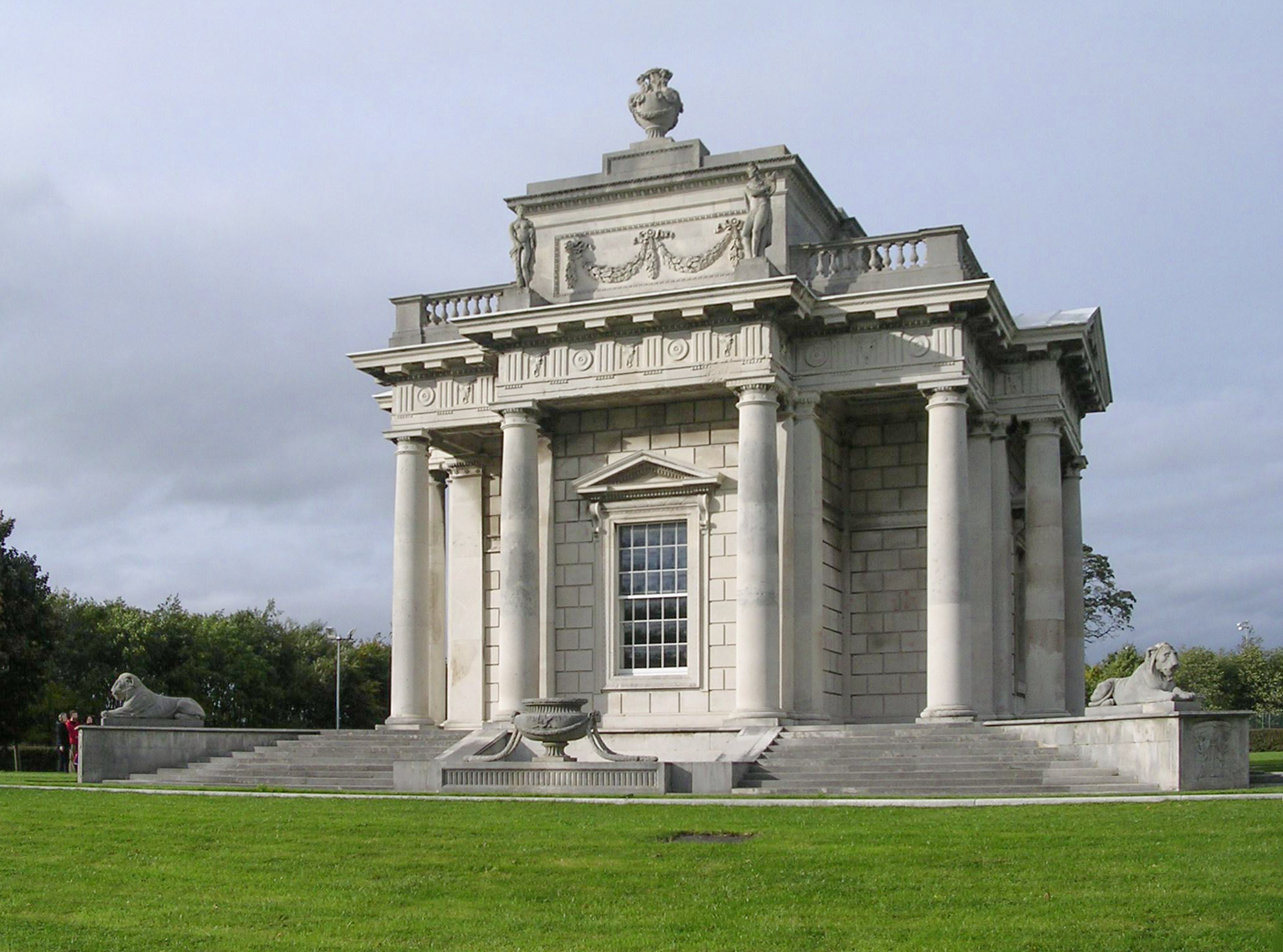
Casino at Marino

- Casino at Marino near Dublin, Ireland, designed by William Chambers is completed at about this date.
- Fort Belan commanding the western end of the Menai Strait in Wales completed.
- Midford Castle folly in Somerset, England, built to a design by John Carter.
- Conygar Tower folly in Somerset, England, built to a design by Richard Phelps.
- Bygholm Castle manor house in Denmark built to a design by Andreas Møller.
- Hôtel des Monnaies, Paris (mint), designed by Jacques Denis Antoine, is largely completed.
- Hôtel Grimod de La Reynière town house in Paris built to a design by Jean-Benoît-Vincent Barré.
- The Wick house in Richmond, Surrey, England, built to a design by Robert Mylne.
- Bostock Hall in Cheshire, England, rebuilt, probably to a design by Samuel Wyatt.
- Ingersley Hall in Cheshire, England built about this date.

== Births ==
- May 8 – George Gwilt the younger, English architect (died 1856)
- October 23 – Gottlob Friedrich Thormeyer, German neoclassical architect (died 1842)
- November 23 – Clemens Wenzeslaus Coudray, German architect (died 1845)
- December 17 – Carlo Rossi, Italian-born architect working in Russia (died 1849)

== Deaths ==
- April 30 – Peter Harrison, English-born architect, active in the Rhode Island colony (born 1716)
- December 28 – John Phillips, English master carpenter, builder and architect (born c.1709)
