= Hôtel de Ville, Cambrai =

Town hall in Cambrai, France

Hôtel de Ville
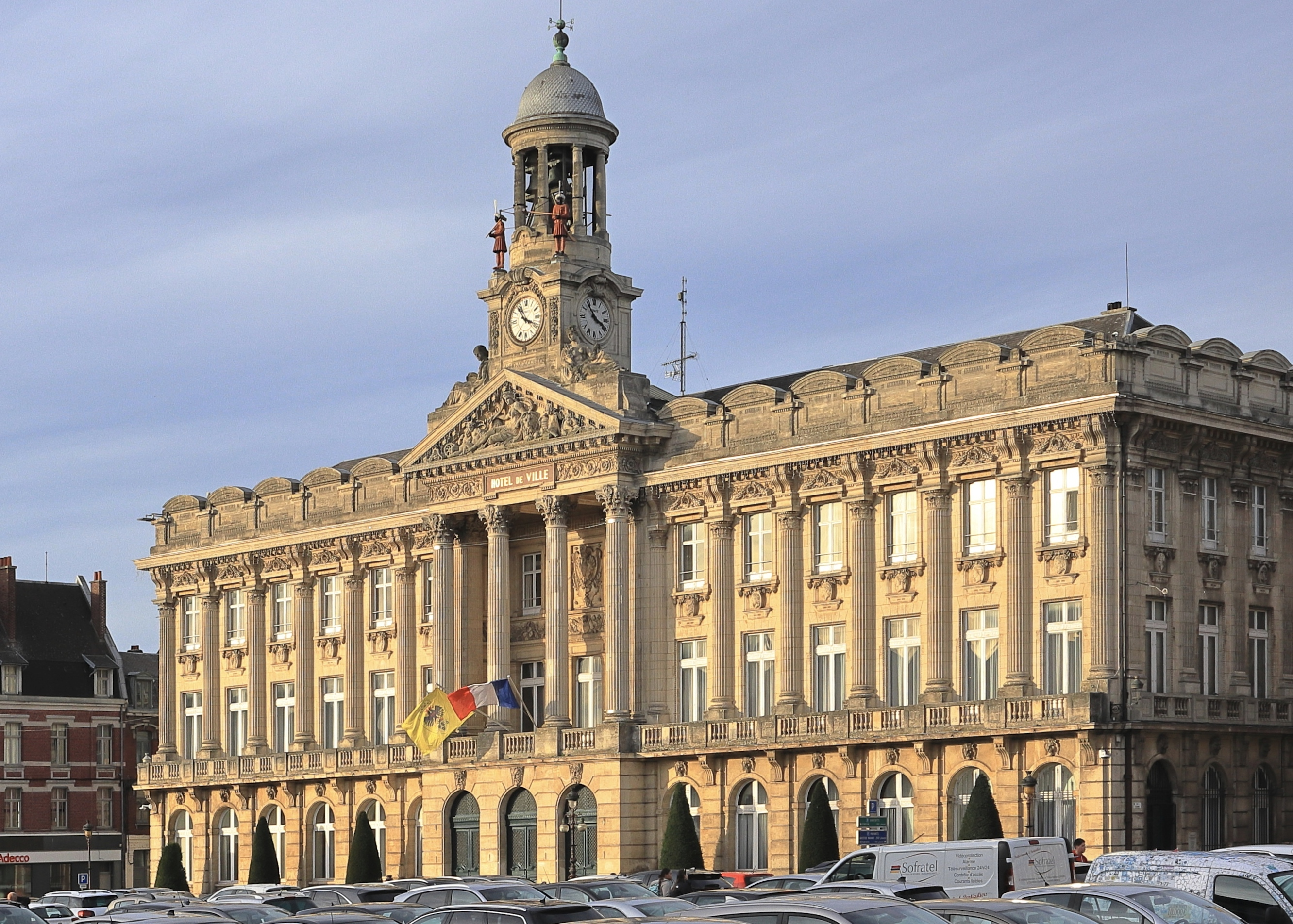
- The main frontage of the Hôtel de Ville in November 2025
- Interactive map of the Hôtel de Ville area

General information
- Type: City hall
- Architectural style: Neoclassical style
- Location: Cambrai, France
- Coordinates: 50.1760°N 3.2347°E
- Completed: 1786

Design and construction
- Architect: Jacques Denis Antoine

The Hôtel de Ville (French pronunciation: [otɛl də vil], City Hall) is a municipal building in Cambrai, Nord, in northern France, standing on Place Aristide-Briand.

== History ==
The first building on the north side of the square (now Place Aristide-Briand) was the Maison de Paix (House of Peace) designed in the medieval style and completed in the 11th century. The design involved a main frontage of just two bays facing onto the square. The building was three storeys high with a sundial on the left-hand side of the second floor and bartizans at the corners. The building was extended to the west by three bays in 1510: the extension was also three storeys high and featured a clock on the second floor and an octagonal belfry above. Two jacquemarts, known as Martin and Martine, were carved by Pierre Van Pulaere and his son, Félix, and placed on the outside of the belfry in 1511. A bretèque (a balcony supported by columns) was added in front of the original building in 1561 and new wings, designed in the Flemish Renaissance style, were added on the right in 1544 and on the left in the 17th century.

Following the capture of the Cambrai by King Louis XIV in March 1677 during the Franco-Dutch War, local architects adopted French architectural styles. So, in the mid-18th century, when the façade was beginning to crumble, the consuls decided to demolish the old Flemish Renaissance style building and to erect a new building in the French neoclassical style. The new building was designed by Jacques Denis Antoine, built in ashlar stone and was completed in 1786.

The design involved a symmetrical main frontage of 19 bays facing onto the square. The central section of three bays, which was slightly project forward, featured three round headed openings on the ground floor, and a tetrastyle portico formed by Corinthian order columns, spanning the first and second floors and supporting a pediment. Behind the pediment, there was a square clock tower surmounted by an octagonal belfry and a dome. The other bays were fenestrated by round headed windows on the ground floor, and by square headed windows on the first and second floors. The bays were all flanked by engaged Corinthian order pilasters supporting a frieze, a modillioned cornice and a parapet. Internally, the principal rooms were the Salle du Conseil (council chamber) and the Salle des Fêtes (ballroom).

New wings at the rear of the building, creating a courtyard, were completed in 1870 and the façade was rebuilt to a design by André de Baralle, Edmond Guillaume and Edouard Renaud in 1872. This reconstruction work involved the removal of the last two bays at each end reducing the main frontage to 15 bays. The carvings in the tympanum were created by the sculptor, Ernest-Eugène Hiolle, in 1875.

Following the Battle of Cambrai in October 1918, during the First World War, the interior of the town hall was badly damaged by the departing German troops. As part of the restoration works, the anteroom to the Salle des Mariages (wedding room) was decorated in the Art Deco style and enhanced by three murals painted by Émile Flamant in the early 1930s. The building was officially reopened to the public in 1932. Following the liberation of the town by the French Forces of the Interior on 30 August 1944, during the Second World War, local people arrived at the town hall and sang La Marseillaise. An extensive programme of refurbishment works, involving restoration of the council chamber and other rooms, was completed in 2017.
