= Hôtel des Monnaies, Paris =

Coordinates: 48°51′25″N 2°20′21″E

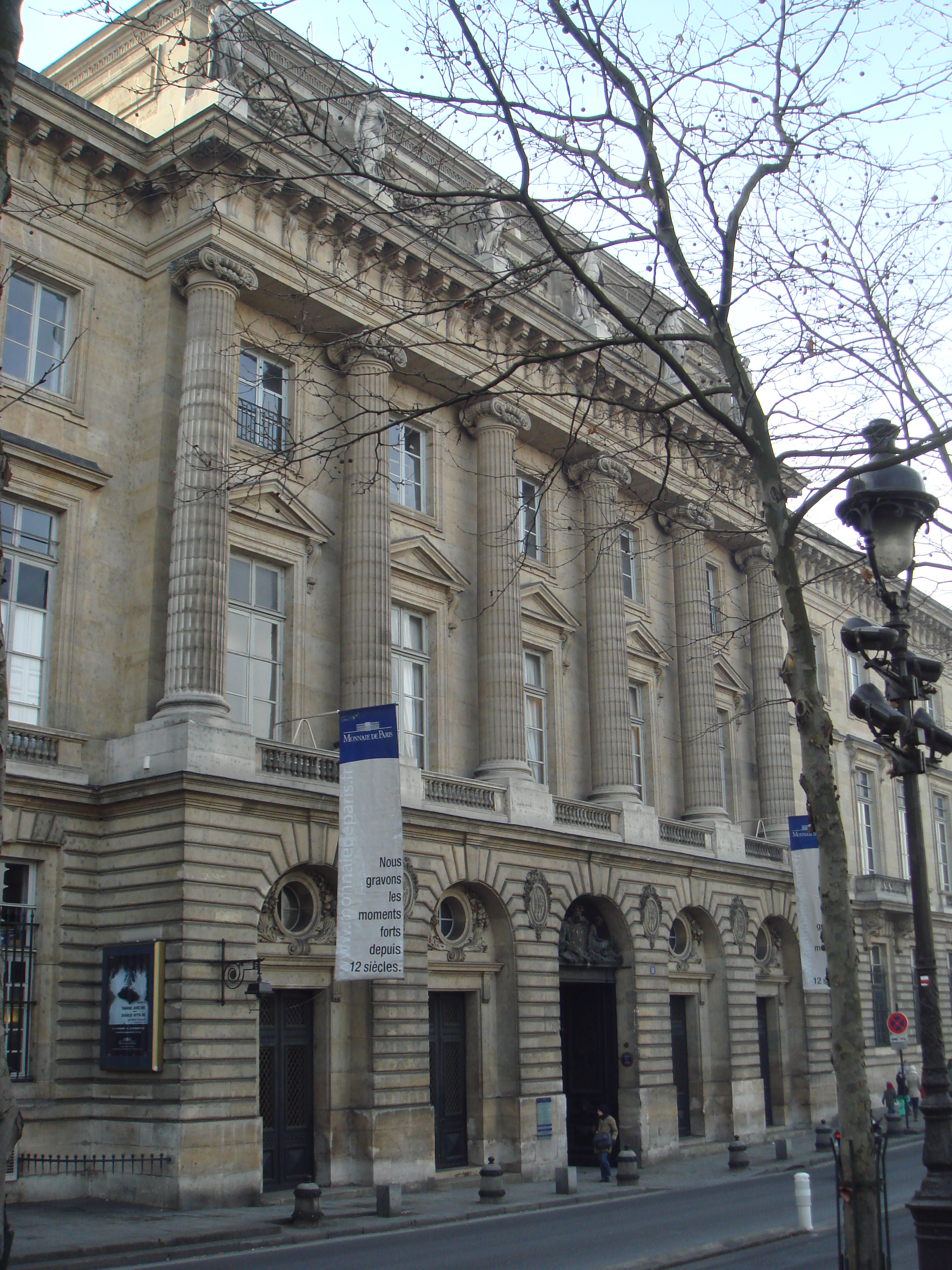
Monnaie de Paris, 11 quai Conti, 75006 Paris.

The Hôtel des Monnaies (French pronunciation: [otɛl de mɔnɛ]) is an 18th-century building located at 11 Quai de Conti in the 6th arrondissement of Paris, which has housed the Monnaie de Paris (the Paris Mint) since its construction. It is considered a prime example of pre-Revolutionary French Neoclassical architecture.

The building is the masterwork of the architect Jacques Denis Antoine (1733–1801), who in 1765 bested Étienne-Louis Boullée and François Dominique Barreau de Chefdeville in a competition to design it. Though it was his first major civic project his design later won him admission to the Académie royale d'architecture.

Demolition of the Hôtel de Conti, which had occupied the site since 1580, was begun in 1768. The first stone was laid by Abbé Joseph Marie Terray on 30 April 1771. The riverside façade was completed in 1773, and the whole exterior and most of the interior by 1775.

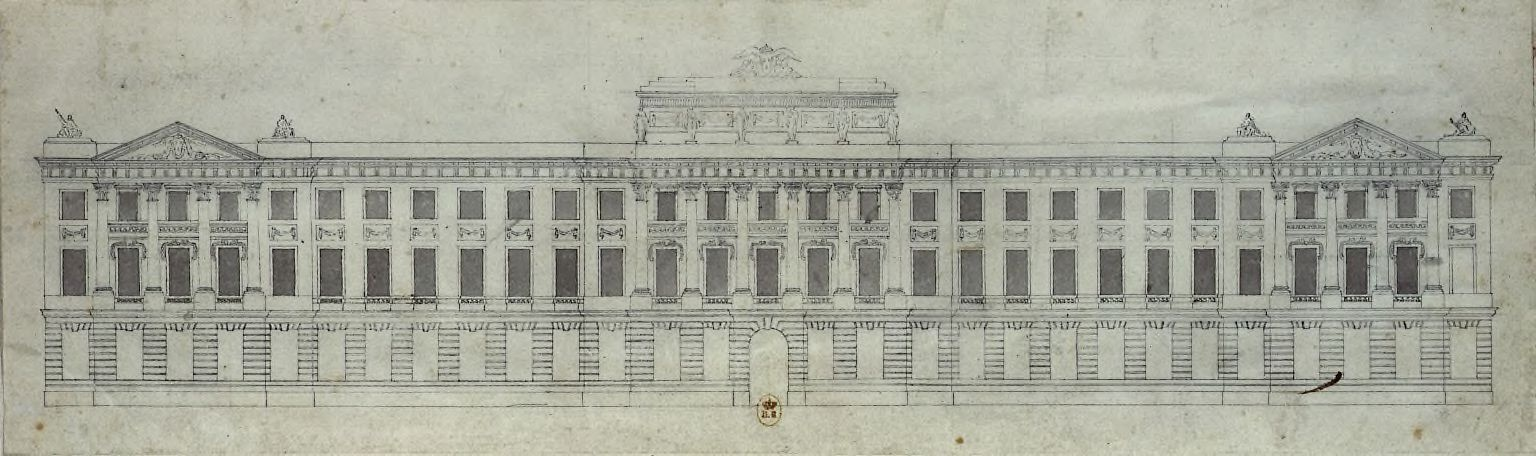
Étienne-Louis Boullée's design for the Hôtel des Monnaies

The building is typified by its heavy external rustication and severe decorative treatment. It boasts one of the longest façades on the Seine; its appearance has been likened to the Italian palazzo tradition. The building, which housed mint workshops, administrative rooms, and residential quarters (for Condorcet), wraps around a large interior courtyard. It remains open to the public and includes a numismatics museum, located within what was once the main foundry.
