= 1709 in architecture =

The year 1709 in architecture involved some significant architectural events and new buildings.

== Buildings and structures ==
=== Buildings ===
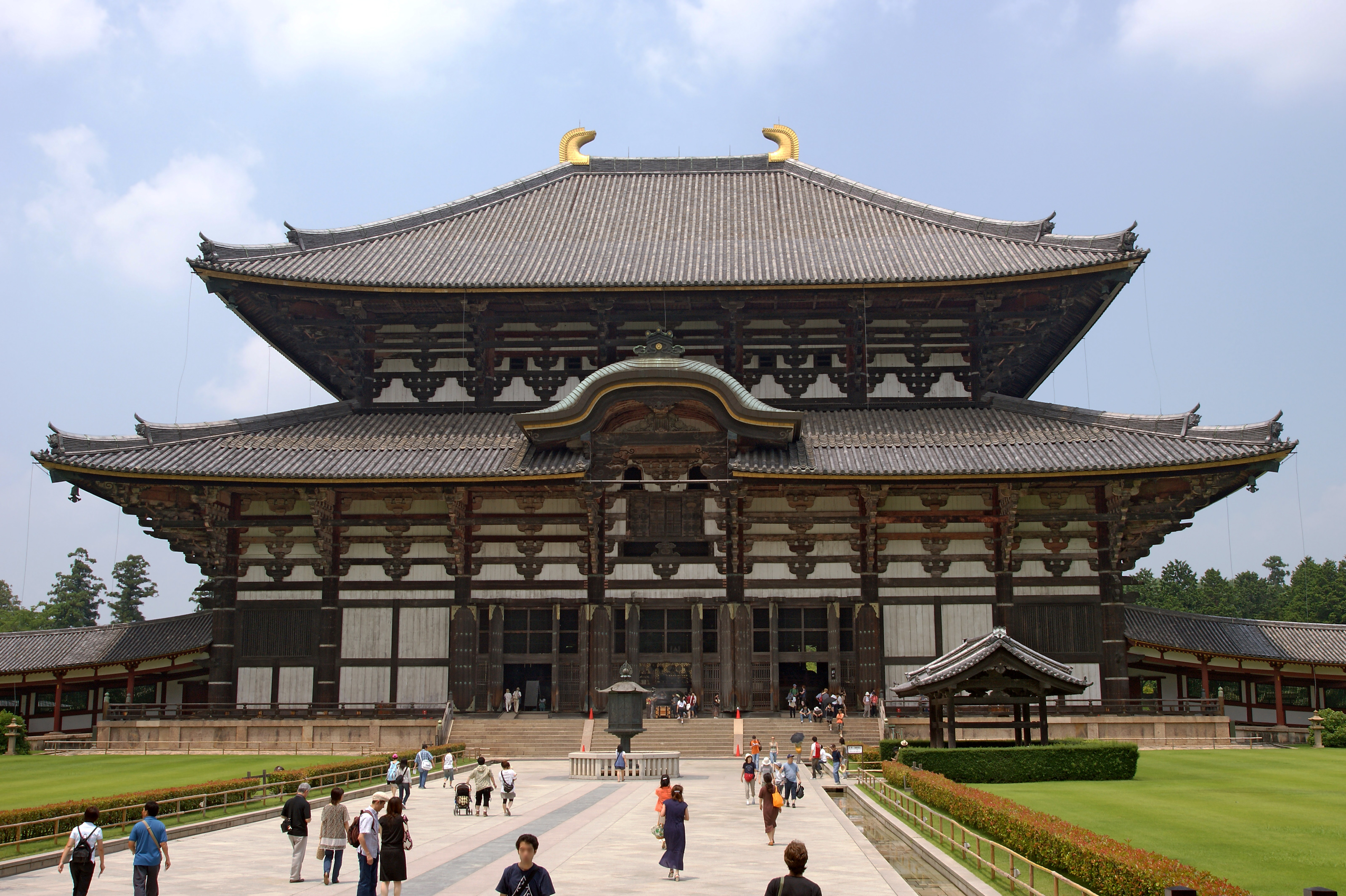
Great Buddha Hall (daibutsuden) of Tōdai-ji as rebuilt in 1709

- In Prague, Hradec Králové, the Bishop's residence, one of the most elaborate baroque buildings in the city, is begun (completed in 1716).
- In Vienna, the Theater am Kärntnertor, designed by Antonio Beduzzi, is built.
- In Nara, Japan, the Tōdai-ji Temple is rebuilt to its current aspect (first built in 709).
- In China, the Chengqi Lou Fujian tulou is built at Gaobei Village (Gaotou Township), China.

== Births ==
- April 25 – Carl Johan Cronstedt, Swedish architect and inventor (died 1779)
- June 4? – Johann Gottfried Rosenberg, German-Danish rococo architect (died 1776)
- September 30 – Johan Christian Conradi, German-Danish master builder and architect (died 1779)
- unknown date – Thomas Ivory, English builder and architect working in Norwich (died 1779)
- Approximate date – John Phillips, English master carpenter, builder and architect (died 1775)

== Deaths ==
- August 31 – Andrea Pozzo, Italian Baroque architect, decorator, stage designer, painter and art theoretician (born 1642)
