= 1779 in architecture =

The year 1779 in architecture involved some significant events.

== Buildings and structures ==
=== Buildings ===
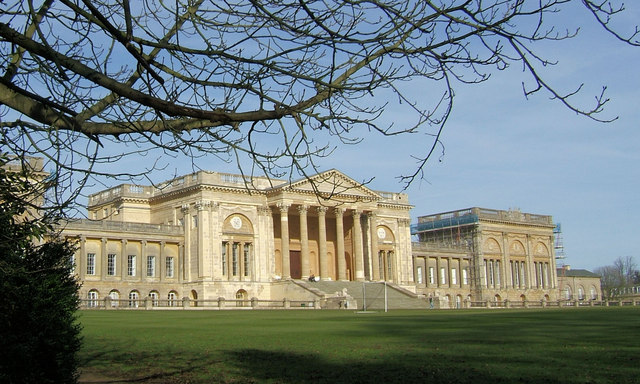
Stowe House

- St Paul's Square, Birmingham, England.
- South façade of Stowe House, England, completed in the neoclassical style based on a design by Robert Adam.
- Robert Adam completes his remodelling of Kenwood House on Hampstead Heath, London.
- New Church of Ireland Christ Church Cathedral, Waterford, designed by John Roberts, completed.
- Fridericianum in Kassel (Hesse), designed by Simon Louis du Ry, completed.
- Royal Saltworks at Arc-et-Senans, designed by Claude Nicolas Ledoux, completed.
- The Piece Hall in Halifax, West Yorkshire, opened 1 January 1779, Grade I listed Cloth Hall.

== Awards ==
- Grand Prix de Rome, architecture: Guy de Gisors and Père François Jacques Lannoy.

== Births ==
- April 10 – James Savage, English architect (died 1852)
- July 8 – Giorgio Pullicino, Maltese painter and architect (died 1851)
- Edward Lapidge, English architect (died 1860)

== Deaths ==
- September 30 – Johan Christian Conradi, German-Danish master builder and architect (born 1709)
- November 9 – Carl Johan Cronstedt, Swedish architect and inventor (born 1709)
- Giuseppe Bonici, Maltese architect and military engineer (born 1707)
- Thomas Ivory, English builder and architect working in Norwich (born 1709)
- Richard Taliaferro, American architect working in Williamsburg, Virginia (born c.1705)
