= Clemens Wenzeslaus Coudray =

German neoclassical architect

Clemens Wenzeslaus Coudray (23 November 1775 in Ehrenbreitstein near Koblenz – 4 October 1845 in Weimar) was a German neoclassical architect. From 1804 to 1816 he worked as court architect in Fulda and from 1816 until his death as Chief Director of the Grand Duchy of Saxe-Weimar-Eisenach, producing several significant buildings in the town of Weimar itself. The asteroid 27712 Coudray is named after him.
