= Mathurin Cherpitel =

French architect

Mathurin Cherpitel (14 December 1736, Paris – 13 November 1809, Paris) was a French architect, whose notable buildings include the Hôtel du Châtelet.

== Biography ==
Mathurin Cherpitel was the son of a master carpenter who helped to build the Rue de Bourgogne in Paris. Cherpitel followed the teachings of Jacques Francois Blondel, and spent three years working as a draftsman for Ange-Jacques Gabriel, before winning the Prix de Rome in 1758.

When he returned to Paris, he had difficulty finding work, but his father, who was employed in several projects in the Faubourg Saint-Germain, managed to find him employment. Around 1765, he was employed by François Dominique Barreau de Chefdeville, working on the Palais Bourbon. During this time, he also drafted plans for a reconstruction of the Hotel Locmaria on the Rue de l'Université for the Duke of Harcourt. In 1766, he participated in the competition for the reconstruction of the Hotel d'Uzes, on the Rue Montmartre, which was won by Claude Nicolas Ledoux. In 1768, he received his first commission: the Lieutenant General of Police, Antoine de Sartine, instructed him to build a nurses' bureau, on the Rue de Gramont.

By 1770, he had become a famous architect. He built the Hotel du Chatelet on the Rue de Grenelle, and his most notable hôtels, the Hotel de Damas d'Antigny and the Hotel de Rochechouart.

His most important public building was the Église Saint-Pierre-du-Gros-Caillou, built in 1775, but destroyed in 1798 and later replaced with a new design. He was received as a member of the Académie Royale d'Architecture in 1776.

== Bibliography ==
- Cleary, Richard (1996). "Cherpitel, Mathurin", vol. 6, p. 554, in The Dictionary of Art, 34 volumes, edited by Jane Turner. New York: Grove. ISBN 9781884446009. Also available at Oxford Art Online (subscription required).
- Gallet, Michel (1995). Les architectes parisiens du XVIIIe siècle (Éditions Mengès ed.). Paris. ISBN 2-85620-370-1.
- Le Bas, Philippe, editor (1840). France. Dictionnaire encyclopédique, volume 1 (A–Az). Paris: Didot Frères. See the article "Académie d'architecture", pp. 82–85 (at Google Books).
- Magny, Françoise (1976). "Mathurin Cherpitel (1736-1809)", Bulletin de la société de l'histoire de Paris et de l'Île-de-France, vol. 103–104 (1976–1977), pp. 95–113. Copy at Gallica.
