= Aray Bridge =

Bridge in Argyll and Bute, Scotland

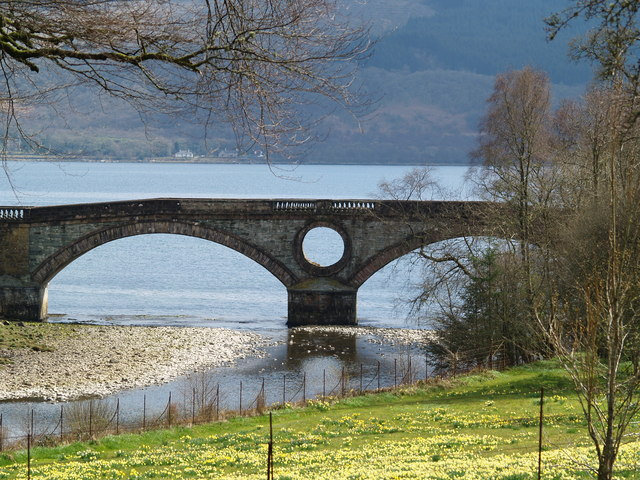
- Aray Bridge from the castle grounds
- Coordinates: 56.2359°N 5.0702°W
- OS grid reference: NN 09816 09052
- Carries: A83
- Crosses: River Aray
- Locale: Argyll and Bute

Characteristics
- Design: Arch
- Material: Stone
- No. of spans: 2

Listed Building – Category A
- Official name: Aray Bridge, Mouth Of River Aray, Arrochar Road
- Designated: 19 July 1971
- Reference no.: LB11545

Location
- Interactive map of Aray Bridge

Aray Bridge, also known as Inveraray Bridge, is a stone two-arch public road bridge on the Inveraray Castle estate near Inveraray in Argyll and Bute, Scotland, carrying the A83 road over the mouth of the River Aray where it flows into Loch Fyne.

== History ==
The present structure replaces a military bridge of 1758 designed by John Adam which was destroyed by floods in 1772. It was planned in 1773 by Robert Mylne for the Board of Ordnance and Colonel John Campbell, 5th Duke of Argyll, on whose estate it stands. The contractor was J. Brown and it was completed in 1775/6.

It was placed at Category A (the highest) on Historic Scotland's listed building designations in 1971. The Arrochar trunk road over the bridge now operates as a single carriageway controlled by traffic lights.

== Description ==
The bridge consists of two equal segmental arch spans of 65 ft (20 m) built of rubble with all faces of dressed masonry and partly balustraded parapets; the central spandrel is pierced and the pier is angular.

== See also ==
- List of bridges in Scotland
