= Groningen City Hall =

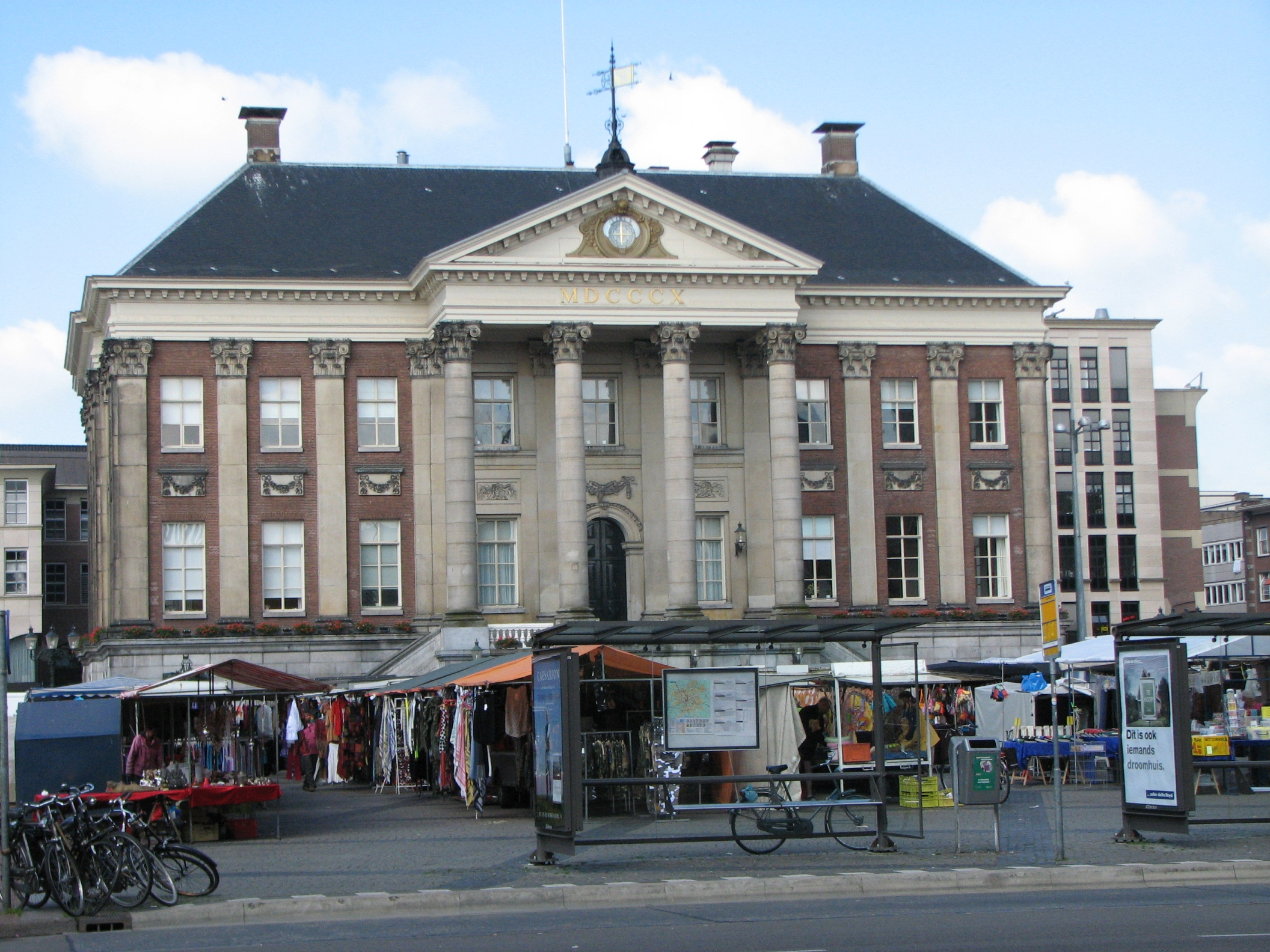
- City Hall
- Interactive map of the Groningen City Hall area
- Alternative names: Stadhuis van Weesp

General information
- Type: Seat of local government
- Architectural style: neo-classical
- Location: Groningen, Grote markt
- Coordinates: 53°13′6″N 6°34′0″E
- Completed: 1810
- Owner: Gemeente Groningen

Design and construction
- Architect: Jacob Otten Husly

Groningen City Hall is the seat of government in Groningen, the Netherlands. The city council meets in a modern room downstairs, but upstairs in the former raadszaal the Gulden Boek is kept that lists the honored citizens of the town.

== History ==
The building was designed by the architect Jacob Otten Husly who won the commission in 1775 as the result of a prize competition that was set out by his personal friend, the council member and ex-Amsterdam professor Petrus Camper. it was built during the years 1775-1810. In 1962, an attached building was designed and built by Jo Vegter. Most offices are currently located here.

=== Gallery ===
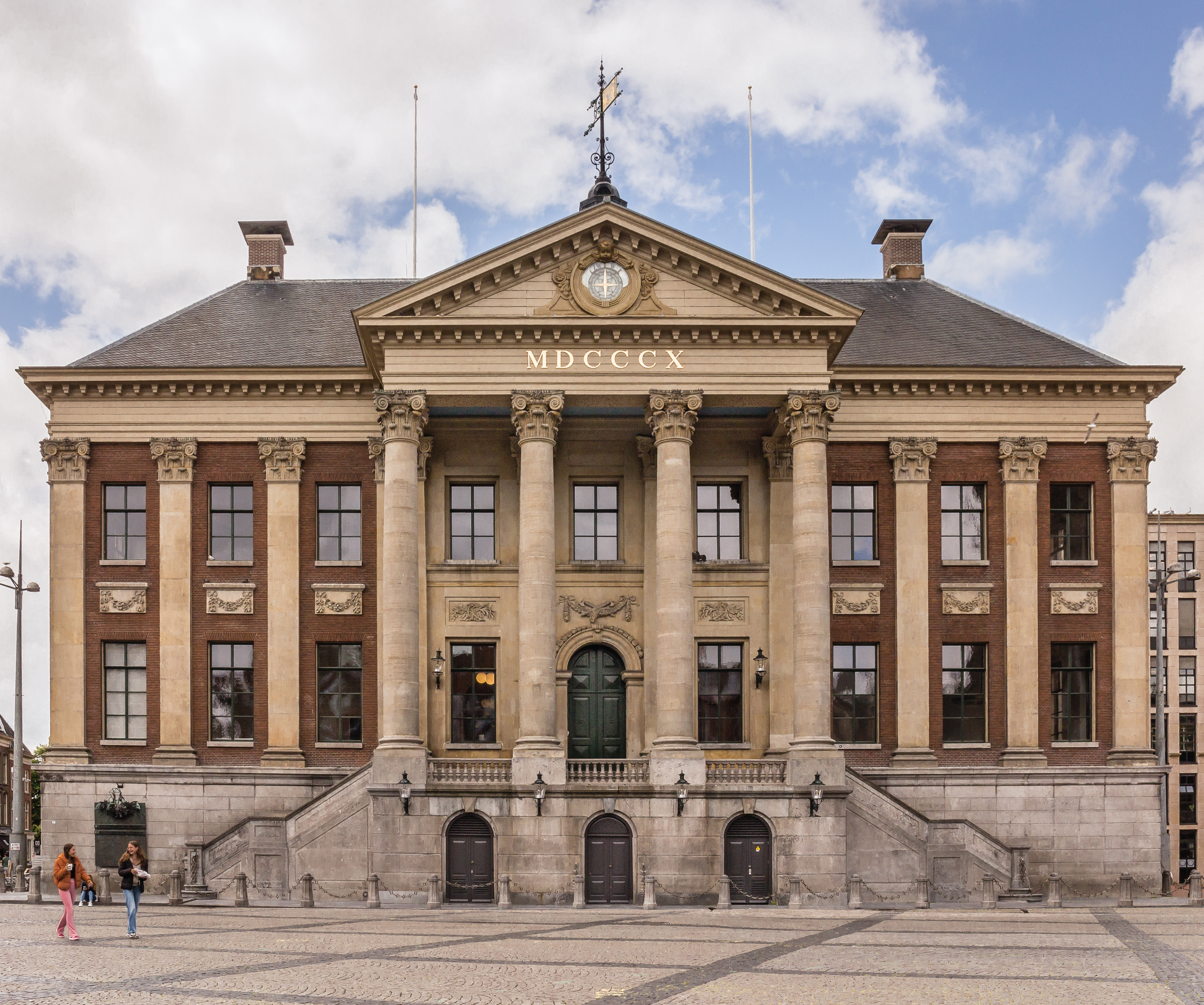
Frontage

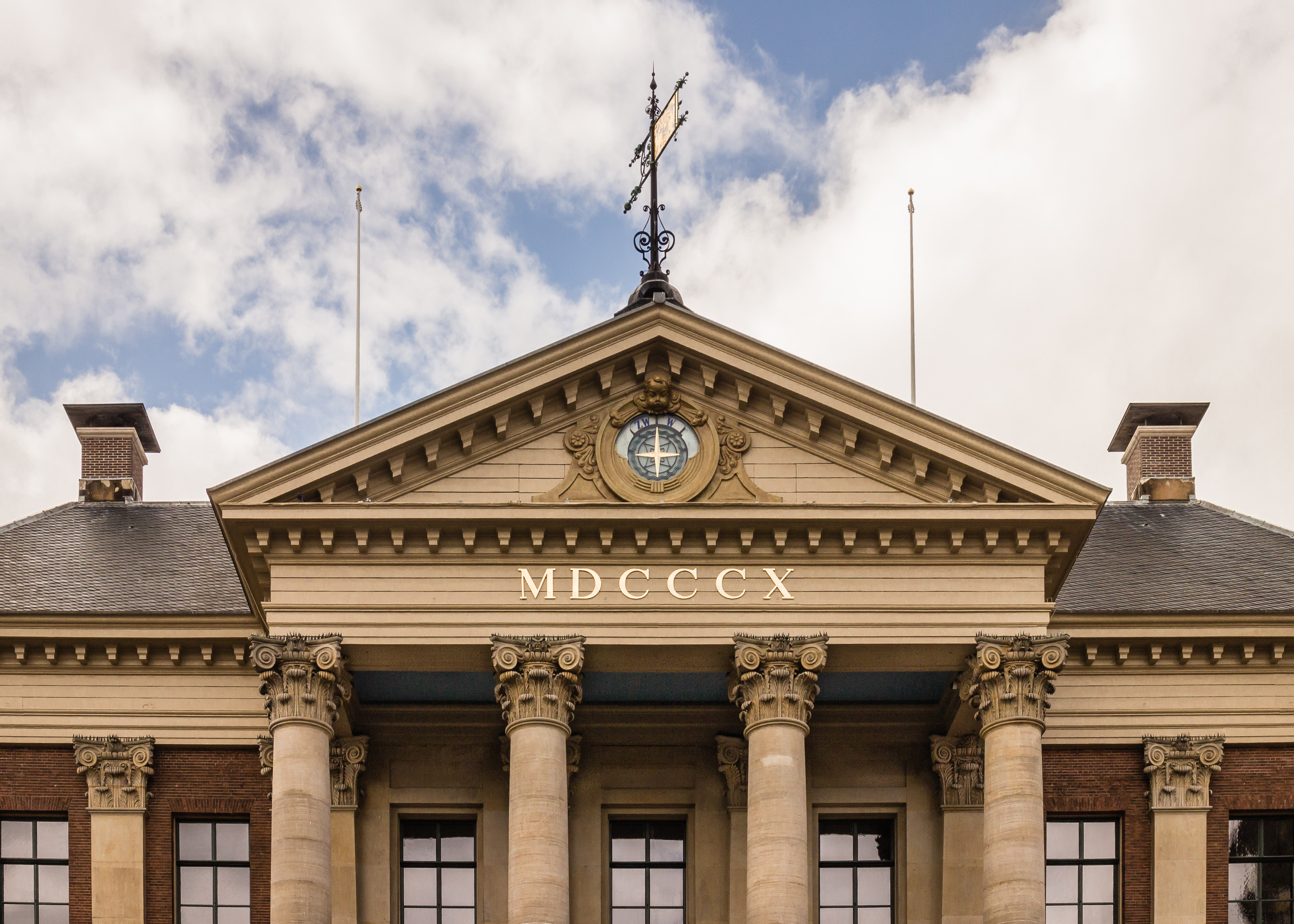
Detail frontage

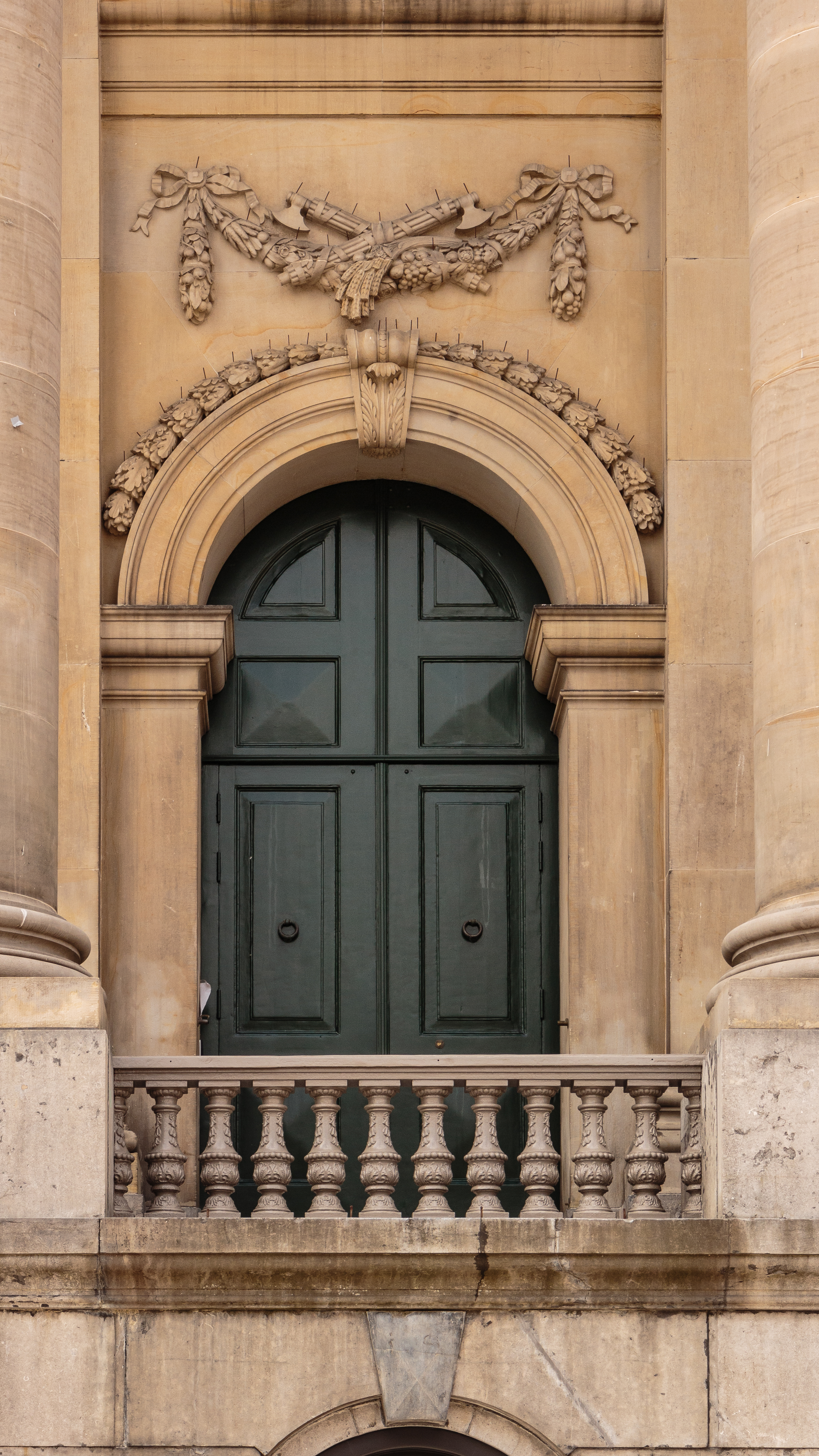
Entrance
