= Jacques Denis Antoine =

French architect

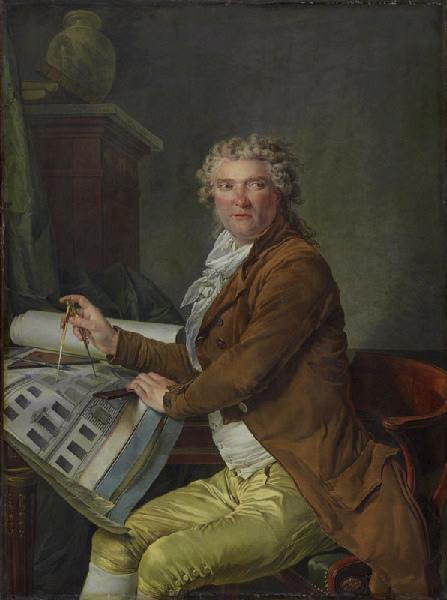
Jacques Denis Antoine, by Louis Rolland Trinquesse (1794)

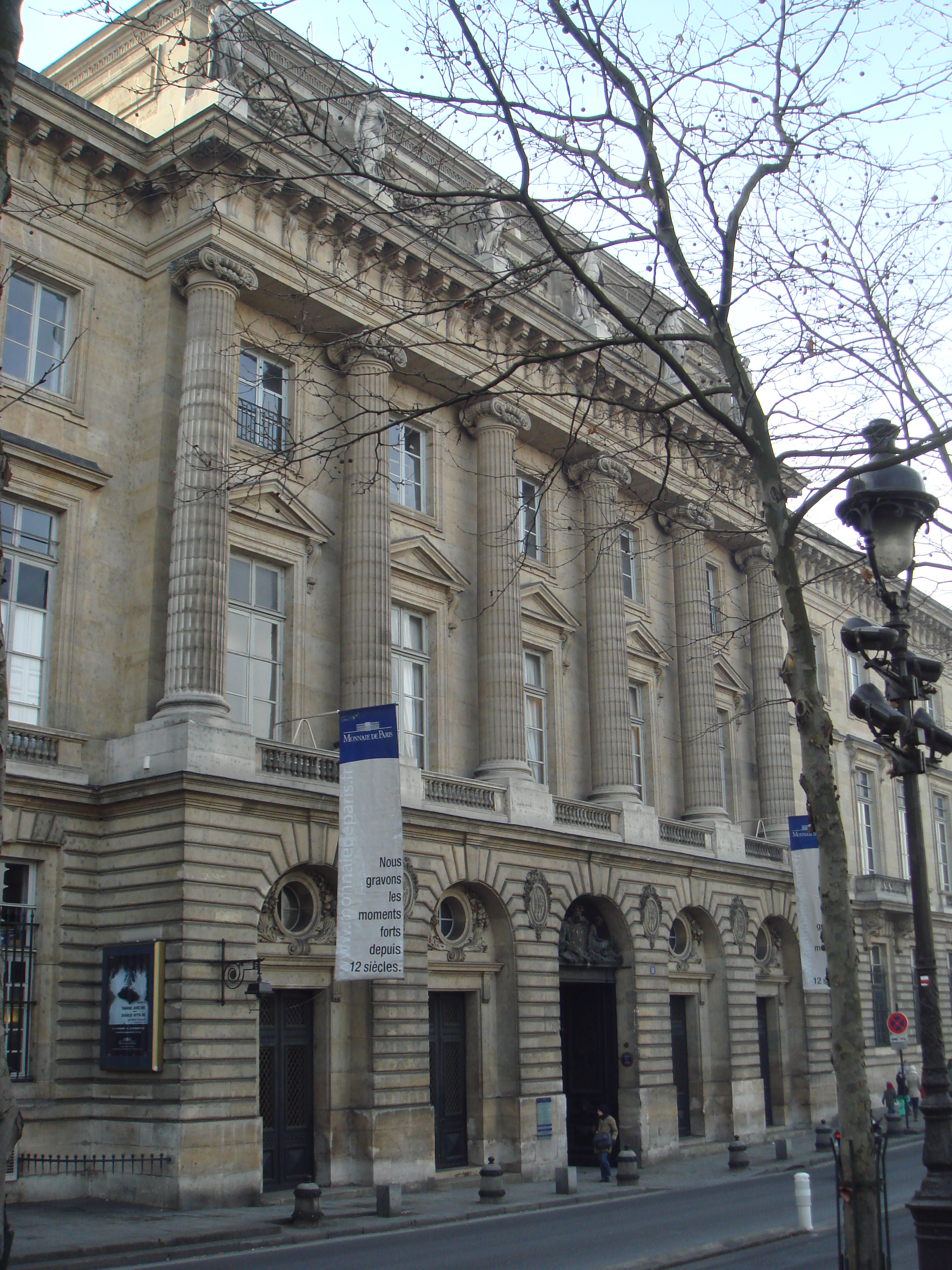
Hôtel des Monnaies

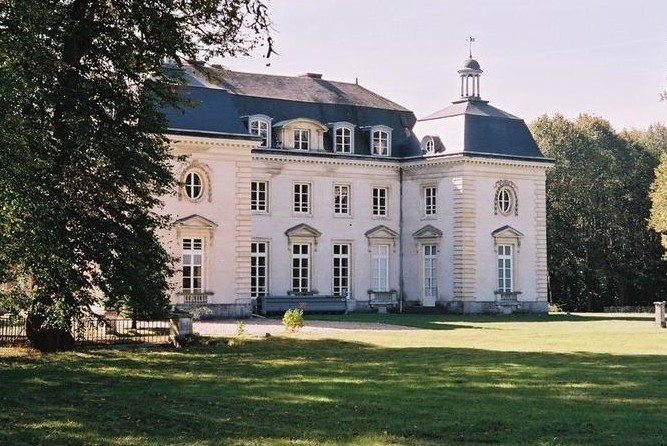
Château du Buisson de May in Upper Normandy

Jacques Denis Antoine (6 August 1733, Paris - 24 August 1801) was a French architect, whose most notable masterwork is the Hôtel des Monnaies in Paris, which gained him entrance to the Académie royale d'architecture in 1776. He is also known for his work on private residences such as the Château of Buisson de May in Normandy, built from 1781 to 1783. Most of his works are in the Neoclassical architectural style.

== Biography ==
The son of a carpenter, he studied with an architect, whose name is unknown, and went to work as a mason. In 1760, he became a contractor and, three years later, began proposing architectural projects. In 1765, he was engaged by the architects Boullée and Chefdeville to build the new Hôtel des Monnaies. After much planning, and a change of location, the first stone was laid in 1771, and the final decorative work finished in 1775. For his management of the project, and its prompt completion, Antoine was admitted to the Académie Royale d'Architecture. He was also given an apartment on the building's second floor, where he lived until his death.

After the fire at the Palais de Justice in 1776, he participated in the reconstruction, including the registry and the audience halls. The following year, he made a trip to Italy, visiting Piedmont, Lombardy and Venice. For part of the trip, he was accompanied by his friend, the architect Charles De Wailly.

As an urban planner, he was the author of several modernization projects; notably a church modelled after the Pantheon, and new façades for the Place Dauphine. He also proposed a plan for linking the Louvre with the Tuileries. Several hospital buildings were his work, including the Hôpital de la Charité and, in 1781, a nursing home for poor priests.

In 1787, he succeeded Claude-Nicolas Ledoux as Director of the Gates of Paris. Although he kept his distance from events during the Revolution, he spent a brief period in the Prison de la Force, in 1793, accused of digging a tunnel from the Seine to the mint, so English agents could steal the gold. He was able to clear himself, and retired to a property he owned in Touraine. Near the end of his career, in 1799, he was elected a member of the Académie des Beaux-Arts, taking Seat #4 for architecture. He died two years later, and was interred at the Cimetière de Saint-Sulpice in Vaugirard.

== Works ==
- 1760: Castle of Verneuil-sur-Indre
- 1766: Hotel des Monnales
- 1771: Partial reconstruction of Hotel Maillebois
- 1771-1775: Mint, qual Conti, Paris
- 1772: Castle of Herces, Bercheres-sur-Vesgre, Eure-et-Loir. Build for Charles Robert Boutin, superintendent of finances.
- 1772: Castle Marville-les-Bois 3, to Louis-Gaspard d'Orfeuil Rusty.
- 1775-1777: Jaucourt Hotel
- 1776: restoration of the Palace of Justice in Paris due to a fire.
- 1781: Château du Buisson de May in Saint-Aquilin-de-Pacy
- 1785: Chapel of the Visitation, Nancy
- 1789: Mint, Berne in Switzerland
- Common Castle Sainte-Geneviève-des-Bois, Essonne, for Benign Louis François Berthier de Sauvigny
- Chateau Haut Rosay Rosay. Factories of the park for Jacques-Louis Brétignières.
- Castle Mussy-Eveque, near Langres, for the Bishop César Guillaume de La Luzerne.
- Charity Hospital, rue des Saints-Peres, Paris. It has now been destroyed.
- Hospice de La Rochefoucauld
- Investment properties. Built for the convent of Feuillants.
- City Hall of Cambrai
- Stairs of the Palace of Alba

== Sources ==
- Biographical data @ Structurae
- "Building the Financial Facade: Jacques-Denis Antoine's Hotel De La Monnaie, The Parisian Mint, 1765-1775" by Amanda Clark @ Whitworth University,
