= Weesp City Hall =

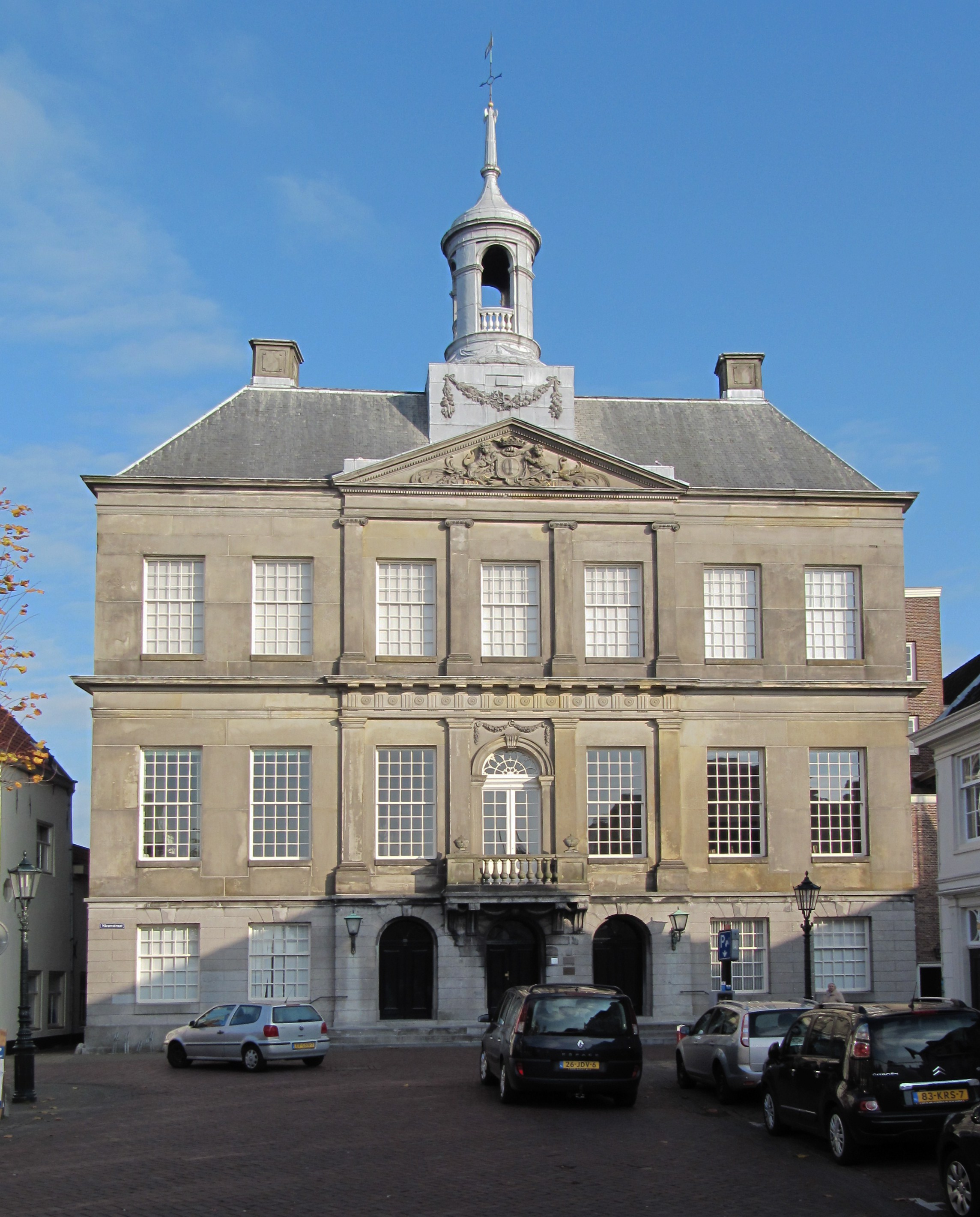
- City Hall, today a museum
- Interactive map of the Weesp City Hall area
- Alternative names: Stadhuis van Weesp

General information
- Type: Seat of local government
- Architectural style: neo-classical
- Location: Weesp, Nieuwstraat 41
- Coordinates: 52°18′24.35″N 5°2′34″E
- Completed: 1776
- Owner: Gemeente Museum Weesp

Design and construction
- Architects: Jacob Otten Husly and Leendert Viervant the Younger

The Weesp City Hall is the former city hall of Weesp, Netherlands. The main body of the municipality, the municipal council, convened in the Raadzaal (Council Hall) until 24 March 2022 when Weesp became part of the municipality of Amsterdam. The administrative offices have moved, but the former Vierschaar and Burgerzaal (Civic Hall) are still used for weddings and other official proceedings. The rest of the building is in use as the local museum of Weesp.

== History ==
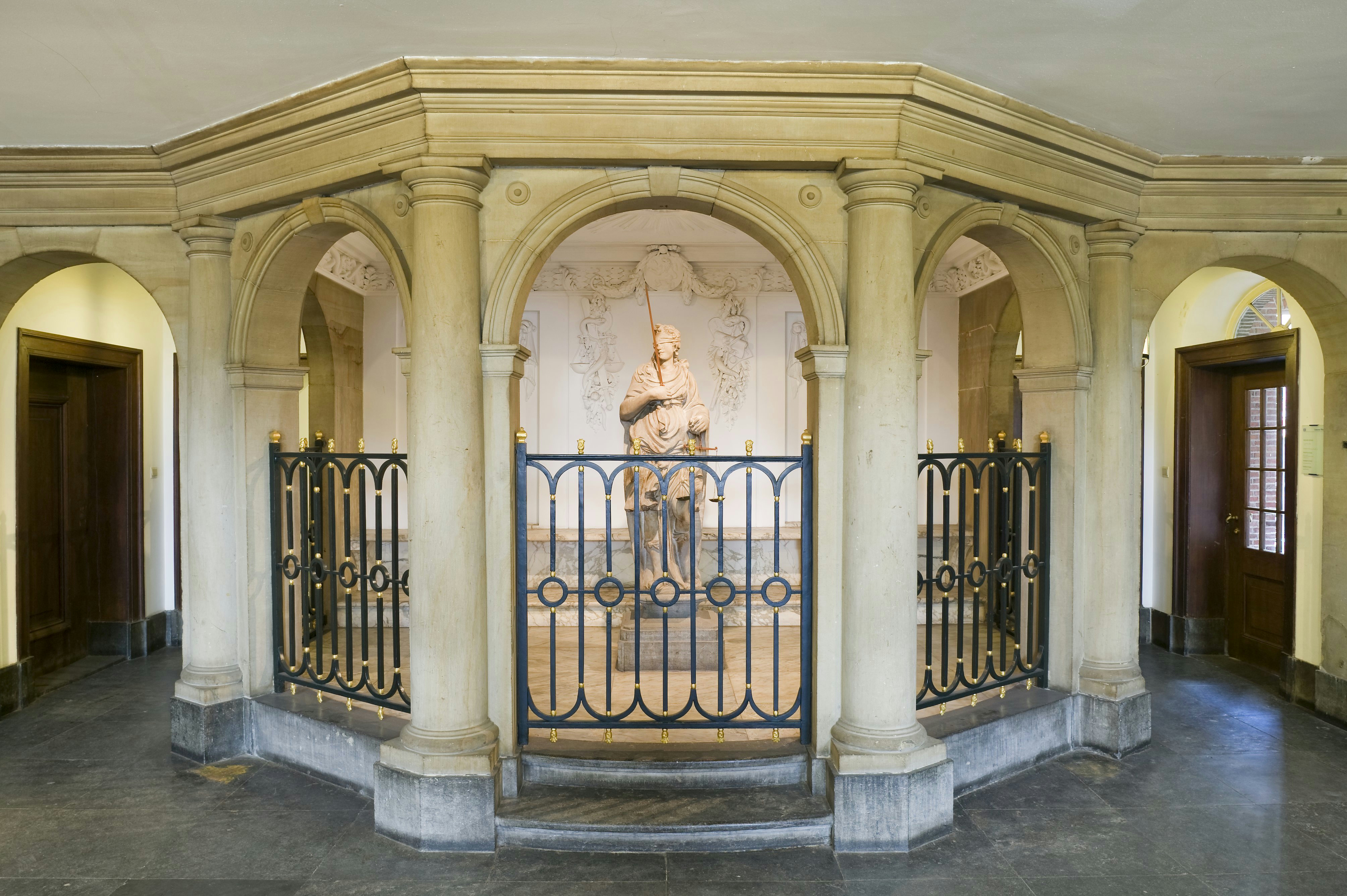
View of the vierschaar on the ground floor in the main hall

The building was designed by the architects Jacob Otten Husly (1738-1796) and his assistant Leendert Viervant the Younger. They built it during the years 1772-1776. The museum started upstairs as an antiquities room in 1911. In 1974 the city council decided to make a proper museum when an important gift of porcelain was given from the legacy of Baron F. van Heeckeren van Waliën. This porcelain collection is now in the former vroedschapskamer, or council meeting room.
