= Hôtel du Châtelet =

Coordinates: 48°51′27″N 2°18′57″E

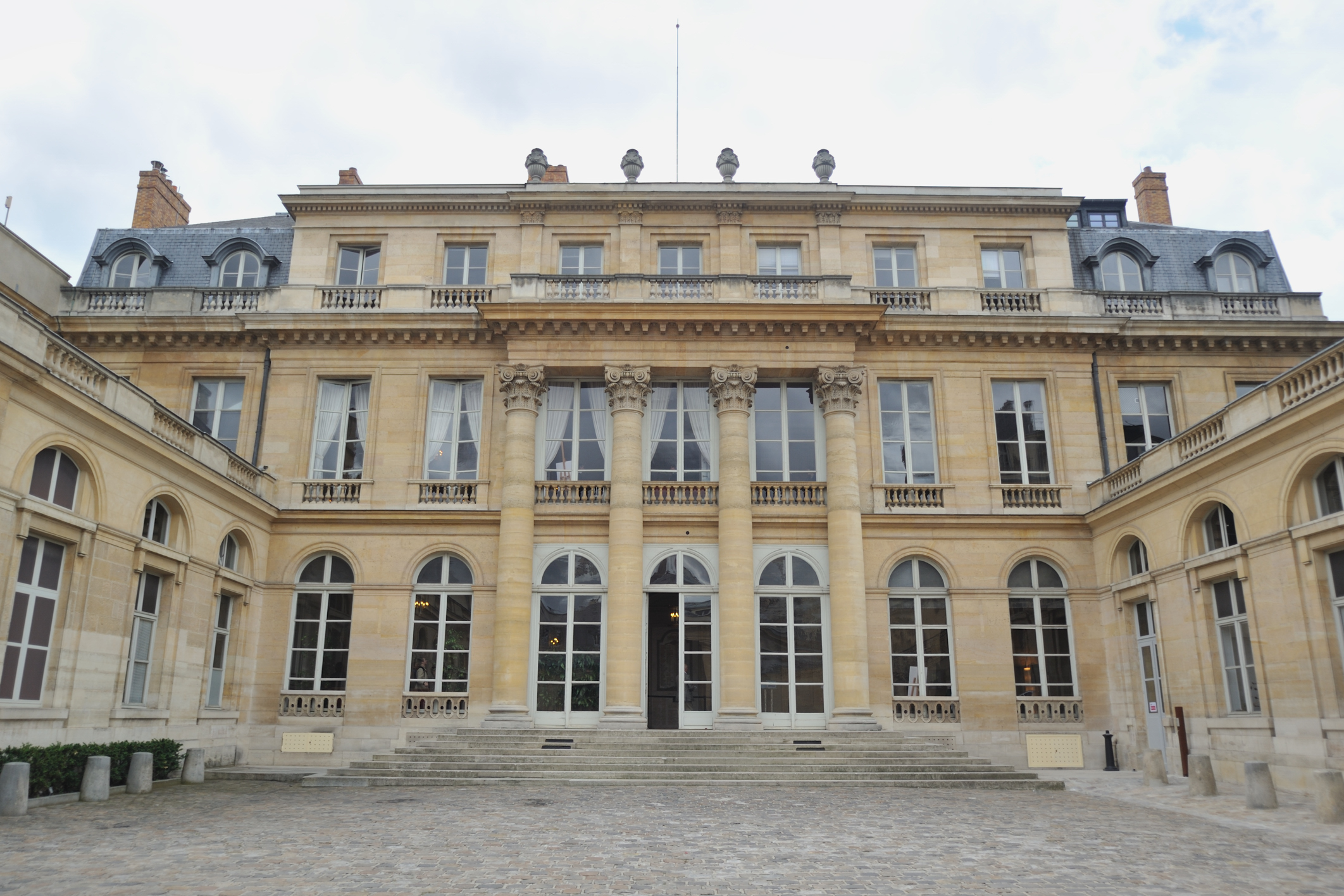
- Façade overlooking the courtyard
- Interactive map of the Hôtel du Châtelet area

General information
- Type: Hôtel particulier
- Location: 127 Rue de Grenelle, Paris, France
- Current tenants: (France) Ministry of Labour
- Construction started: 1770
- Completed: 1776
- Owner: (France) French Republic

Design and construction
- Architect: Mathurin Cherpitel

The hôtel du Châtelet (French pronunciation: [otɛl dy ʃatlɛ]) is an hôtel particulier, a kind of large townhouse in France, at 127, Rue de Grenelle, in the 7th arrondissement, Paris, opposite the Hôtel de Besenval. The building is now the seat of the Ministry of Labour and the minister's official residence.

== History ==
Hôtel du Châtelet was commissioned from Mathurin Cherpitel in 1770 by the Duke of Châtelet, and completed in 1776. After the duke was guillotined in 1793, the house was inscribed on the list of civil buildings, and it served from 1796 to 1807 as the headquarters of the École nationale des ponts et chaussées.

From 1807 to 1830, it was attached to the Imperial, and later Royal, Household. Between 1830 and 1849, it served as the Turkish embassy, and then the Austrian embassy. In 1849, Napoleon III's government paid for renovations and gave the building to the Archbishop of Paris whose palace had burned down in 1831. From 1849 to 1905, the building's main body served as the archiepiscopal residence.

Upon the 1905 French law on the Separation of the Churches and the State, the state took the building back, granting it in 1907 to what was then called the Ministry of Labour and Social Welfare. Following restoration in 1908, it became the headquarters of the ministry. In 1968, it was the site of the signature of the Grenelle agreements.
