= Jacob Otten Husly =

Dutch architect (1738–1796)

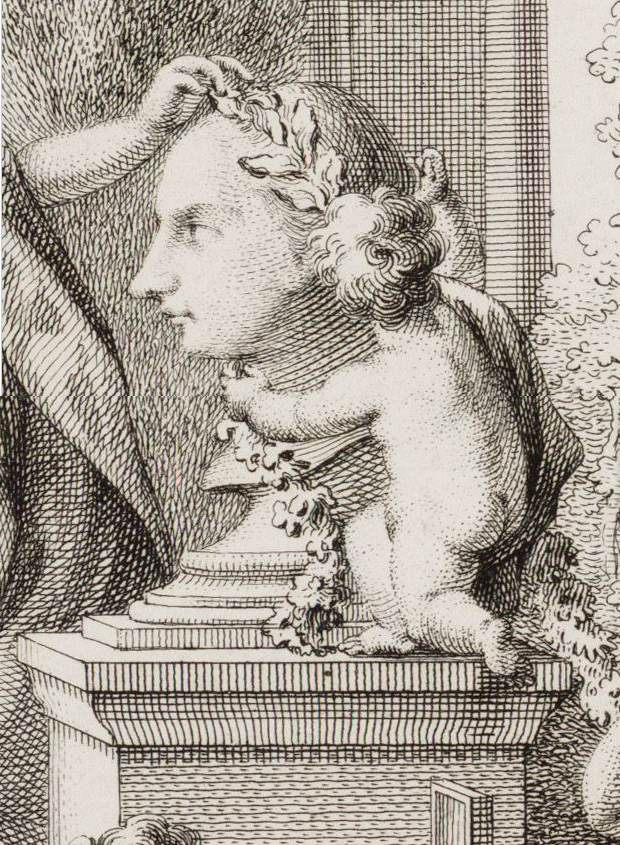
- Allegorical portrait
- Born: 16 November 1738; Doetinchem
- Died: 11 January 1796 (aged 57); Kampen
- Occupation: Architect
- Projects: City Hall, Weesp; Groningen City Hall; Felix Meritis

Jacob Otten Husly (16 November 1738 – 11 January 1796) was an 18th-century architect from the Dutch Republic.

== Biography ==
He was born in Doetinchem to Albert Otten and Anna Hendrica Huslij, and added his mother's surname to his name from 1760, probably because he was a pupil of her family members Hans Jacob Huslij and Hendrik Huslij. He made designs in the popular neoclassical style in the eighteenth century. He won prizes in various drawing competitions and in 1768 he wrote a pamphlet on competitions for the city drawing academy in Amsterdam.

He was the director of the drawing academy in Amsterdam called the Stadstekenacademie. In 1772–1776 he designed and built the City Hall of Weesp with his nephew Leendert Viervant the Younger. In 1775 he won a prize for the new City Hall to be built in Groningen. In 1787–1779 he won a prize for the new building called Felix Meritis in Amsterdam to house a new society of the arts and sciences there. In Haarlem he assisted his nephew Viervant with decorations for the Oval room, the first room of the Teylers Museum. He died, aged 57, in Kampen.

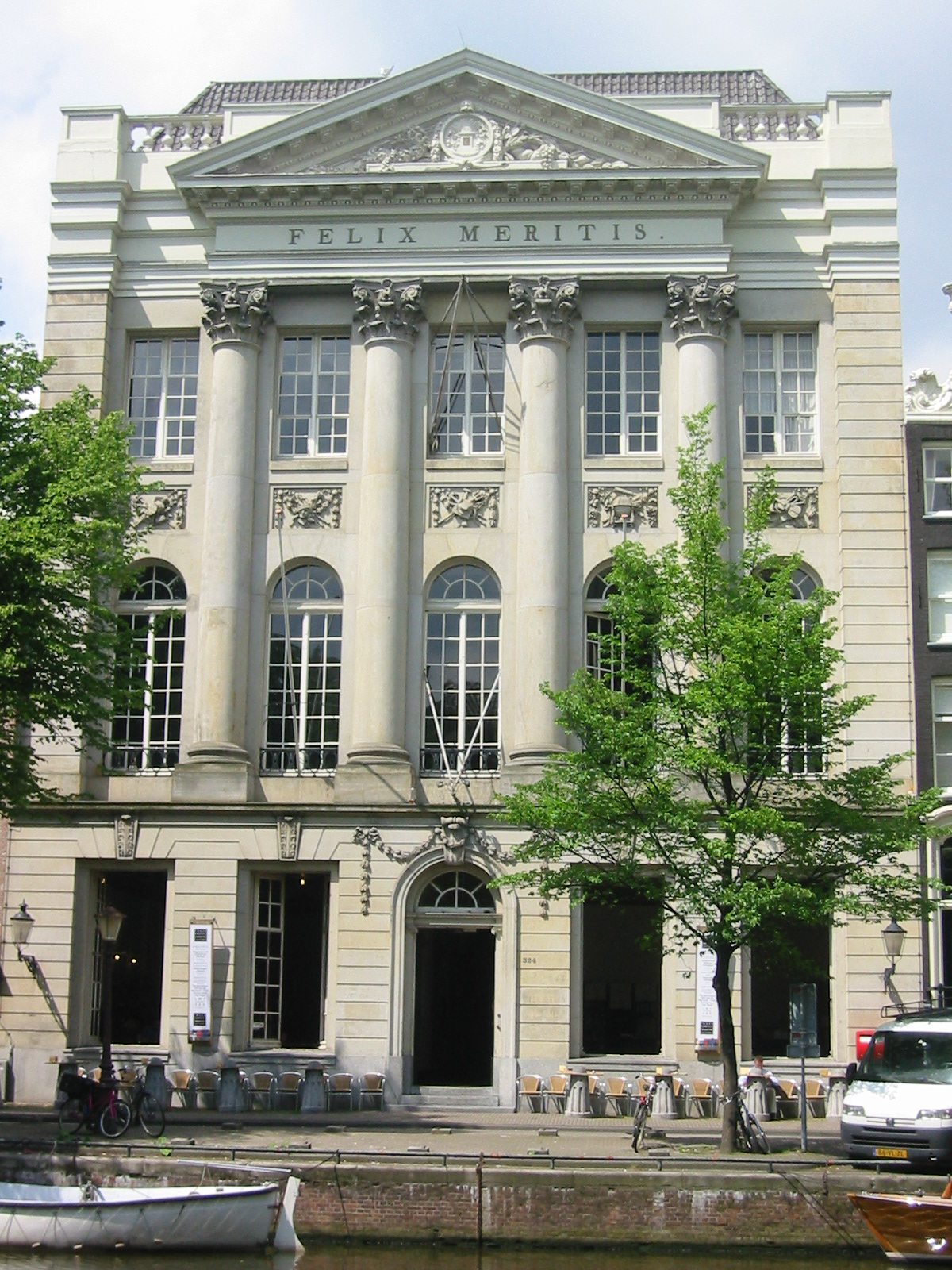
Felix Meritis

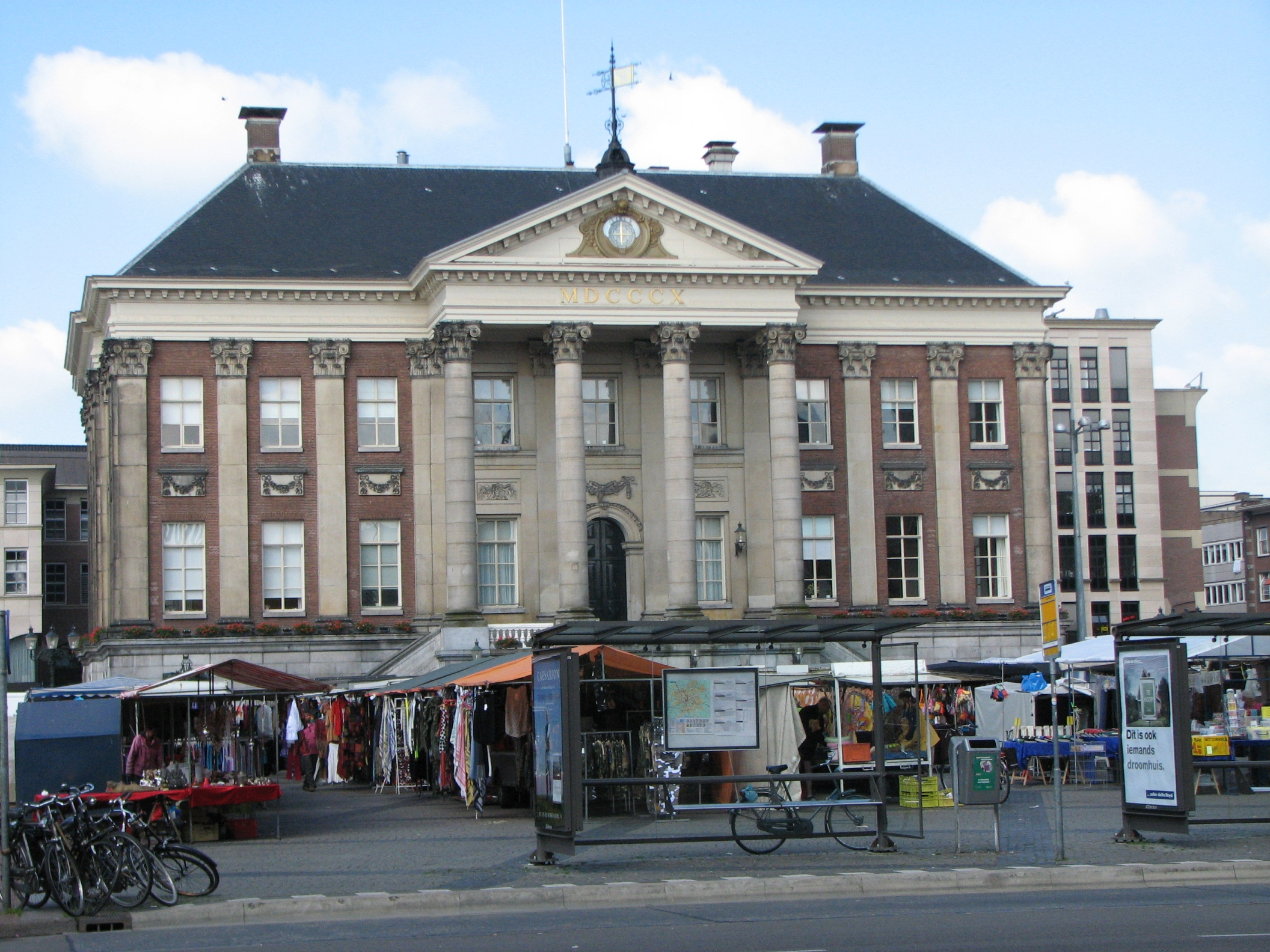
City hall, Groningen

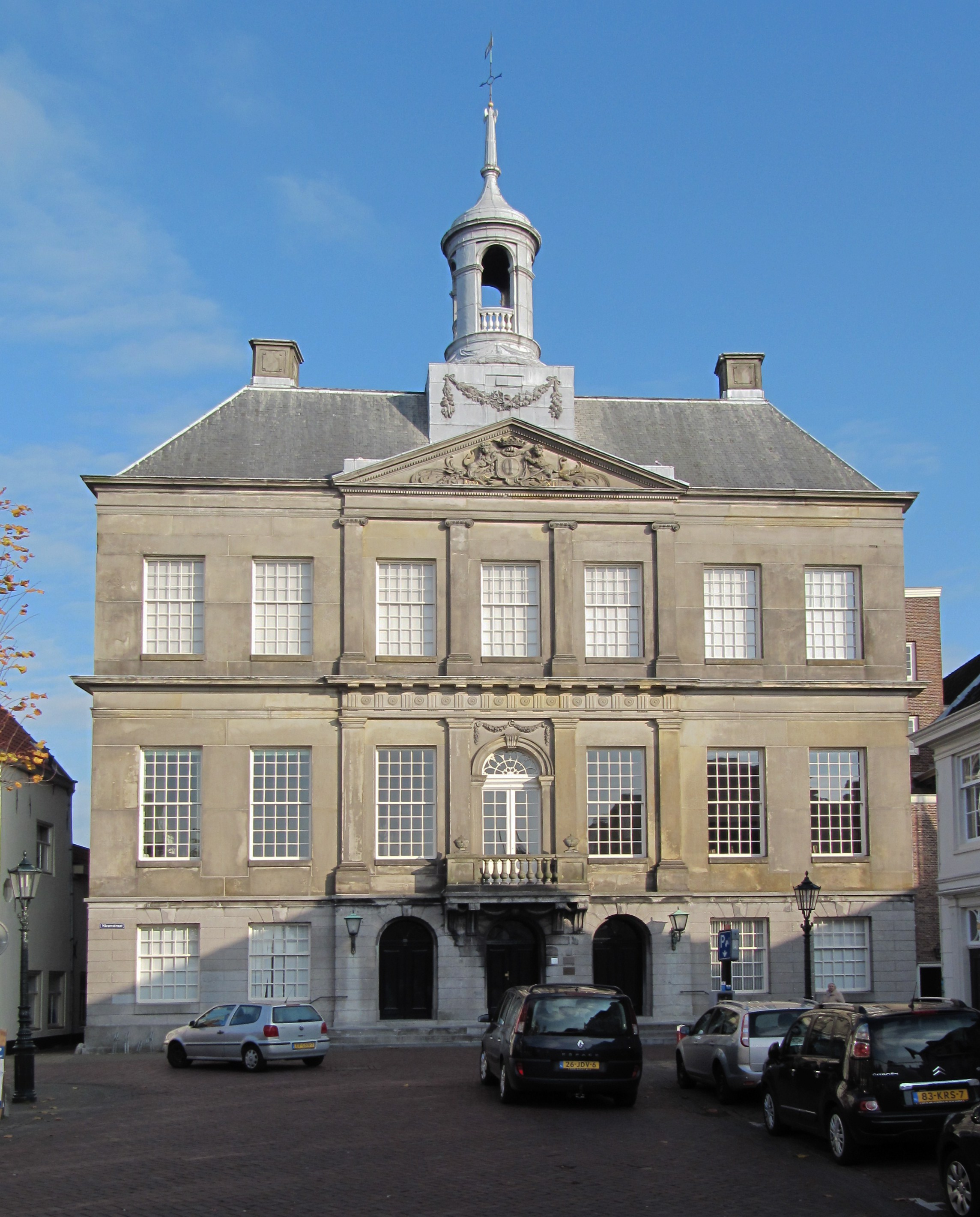
City Hall, Weesp
