= François Dominique Barreau de Chefdeville =

François Dominique Barreau de Chefdeville (French pronunciation: [fʁɑ̃swa dɔminik baʁo də ʃɛfdəvil]; 1725 – 29 June 1765) was a French architect.

== Life ==
From a good middle-class Paris family, Bareau de Chefdeville studied architecture under Germain Boffrand and one first prize in the 1749 Prix de Rome for a "temple of peace, isolated, in the style of antique temples". He stayed in Rome from October 1751 to August 1753, at the same time as Pierre-Louis Moreau-Desproux, Pierre-Louis Helin, Marie-Joseph Peyre and Charles De Wailly, and from there visited Naples with the sculptor Augustin Pajou and the rest of Italy with the painter Silvestre le fils. Returning to Paris, he got to know Ange Laurent Lalive de Jully (1725-1779), announcer of ambassadors and close to Madame de Pompadour. Pompadour wished to return to forms inspired by the antique and thus to renew the grand style of the reign of Louis XIV, in reaction against rococo.

Barreau de Chefdeville died prematurely, at 40, and was replaced at the Palais-Bourbon by Antoine Matthieu Le Carpentier and at Bordeaux by Oudot de MacLaurin.

== Bibliography ==
- Michel Gallet, Les architectes parisiens du XVIIIe siècle, Paris, Éditions Mengès, 1995 – ISBN 2-85620-370-1
- F.-G. Pariset, L'architecte Barreau de Chefdeville (1725-1765), Bulletin de la société d'histoire de l'art français, 1962
